= Conservation Fallout =

Book by John Wills

- Author: John Wills
- Genre: Non-fiction
- Publisher: University of Nevada Press
- Publication date: 2006
- Media type: Print
- Pages: 244 pp.
- ISBN: 978-0-87417-680-3
- OCLC: 67240304

Conservation Fallout: Nuclear Protest at Diablo Canyon is a 2006 book by John Wills.

Widespread public opposition accompanied the rise of the U.S. nuclear industry during the 1960s and 1970s. In Conservation Fallout, Wills examines one of the most controversial nuclear projects of the period: Pacific Gas and Electric's Diablo Canyon Power Plant, which was built in a relatively unsettled, biologically diverse, and scenic part of the central California coast. Wills bases his book on extensive interviews with the individuals involved, as well as on the archives of the Sierra Club, several protest organizations, public agencies, and PG&E.

== See also ==
- Anti-nuclear movement in California
- Anti-nuclear protests in the United States
- Critical Masses: Opposition to Nuclear Power in California, 1958–1978
- Dark Circle
- John Gofman
- List of books about nuclear issues
- Nuclear power in the United States
- San Onofre Nuclear Generating Station
