= Mothers for Peace =

Anti-nuclear activist group

San Luis Obispo Mothers for Peace (SLOMFP) is a participant in the anti-nuclear movement in California which is depicted in the anti-nuclear documentary film Dark Circle during the early years of protest opposing the Diablo Canyon Power Plant (DCPP). In Dark Circle, Mothers for Peace takes credit for delays which prevented the plant from going online prior to the discovery of the errors.

== Activities ==
Interest in issues with which SLOMFP contend have received considerable heightened public interest subsequent to the Fukushima nuclear accidents. With discovery of the Shoreline Fault, SLOMFP has expressed heightened concern about Diablo Canyon earthquake vulnerability.

The primary current roles of SLOMFP consists of a website, outreach efforts of Jane Swanson, the current spokesperson, fundraising, and litigation. Discovery of a new earthquake fault near DCPP re-energized the anti-nuclear movement in San Luis Obispo county, and Swanson travelled to Santa Barbara and took part in a forum at the Faulkner Gallery of the Central Library on June 30, 2011. The meeting was attended by Supervisor Janet Wolf and co-hosted by the Nuclear Ages Peace Foundation and the Santa Barbara chapter of the Women's International League for Peace and Freedom.

SLOMFP was traumatized by an alleged embezzlement of $31,000 by their former treasurer, who was prosecuted and appeared in SLO criminal court in November for pre-trial procedures. Despite this, and its history of civil disobedience, SLOMFP contends that it possesses security clearances such that the NRC should grant it access to information on terrorism vulnerabilities of DCPP with respect to nuclear spent fuel storage. Swanson frequently discusses various forms of vulnerability, specifically challenging the adequacy of the no-fly zone policies putatively in place over Diablo. For instance, in an interview with KCSB's radio journalist Cathy Murrillo, Swanson contends that according to the FAA it is not a no-fly zone but merely a pilot advisory not to loiter. She frequently cites outside experts such as the Union of Concerned Scientists or the National Academy of Sciences.

== Litigation ==
The SLOMFP commenced litigation of five contentions of which four were accepted to proceed. The litigation before the Atomic Safety Licensing Board has been placed on hold as of the Order of June 7, 2011. This delay has no bearing on the merits but has been proclaimed as a victory by anti-nuclear activists even though it had originally been requested by Pacific Gas & Electric. The primary coordinator of the litigation is Elizabeth Apfelberg, who is also Treasurer, whom their website bills as a "lay attorney". Apfelberg has been with SLOMFP since 1973. They also employ attorney Diane Curran. Swanson was quoted by an environmentally oriented online journalist as summarizing their intent as follows: "Our goal, with the services of our attorney in Washington D.C., Diane Curran, is to ensure that safety issues pertaining to both the reactors and the radioactive wastes at Diablo Canyon are fully studied before the NRC considers PG&E's application for license renewal."

== See also ==
- Abalone Alliance
- Alliance for Nuclear Responsibility
- Dark Circle (film)
- Diablo Canyon Power Plant
- San Onofre Nuclear Generating Station
