= Sundesert Nuclear Power Plant =

Canceled power station in California, United States

Proposed site of the Sundesert Nuclear Power Plant
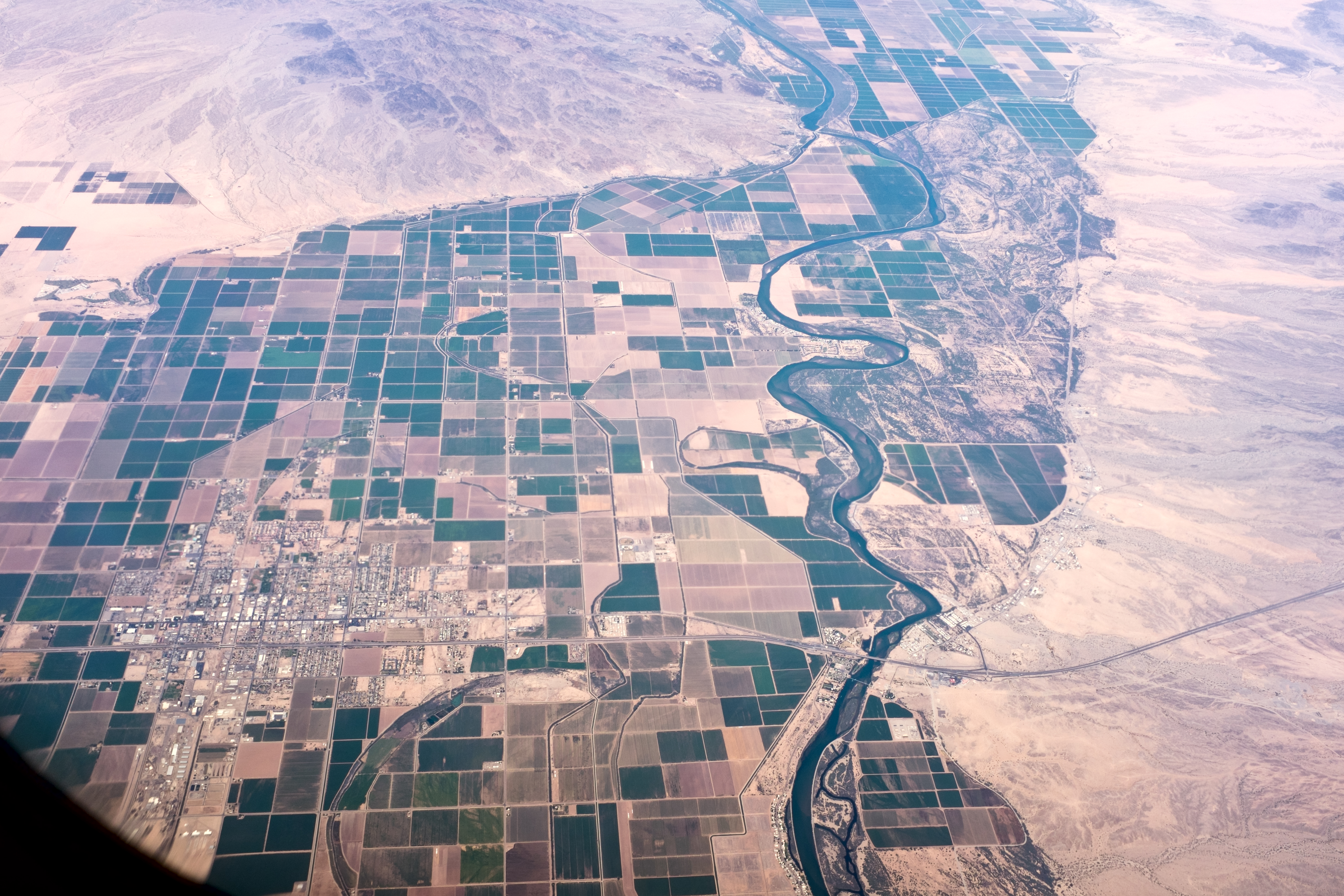
- Blythe, California, surrounding fields, and the Colorado River: the town is 15 miles from the canceled nuclear facility
- Country: United States
- Location: California
- Coordinates: 33°26′59.21″N 114°46′58.42″W
- Status: Cancelled

The Sundesert Nuclear Power Plant was a proposed California nuclear power station, formally submitted in 1976. Facing firm opposition from the state's Governor Jerry Brown and denied a permit by a state agency, plans for the construction of the power facility were rejected in 1978 after 100 million dollars had been spent towards its construction. The Sundesert proposal was the last major attempt to build a nuclear plant in California.

== History ==
=== Background ===
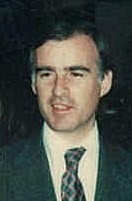
California Governor Jerry Brown in 1978

Opposition to nuclear power plants in California began in 1958 over the proposed Bodega Bay Nuclear Power Plant near the small fishing town of Bodega Bay, California. The six-year controversy pitted utility company Pacific Gas and Electric against local activists opposed to the location of the nuclear plant. According to nuclear power historian Thomas Wellock, this successful fight by the activists, the first in the history of nuclear power, led directly to the eventual growth of California’s anti-nuclear movement. A second battle by state environmentalists stopped a nuclear facility proposed for Malibu, California, in the scenic oceanside Corral Canyon, in 1970.

However, by the early 1970s, the future of nuclear energy in California was projected to expand on a major scale, with numerous proposals on the drafting boards of the state’s utility companies.

In the mid- and late 1970s, plans envisioned as future United States energy policy by the Carter Administration called for hundreds of new nuclear plants to be built nationwide. But under Governor Jerry Brown who was elected in 1975, California was heading in the opposite direction.

=== Proposal and rejection ===
In 1976, after purchasing the necessary parcel of land the previous year, San Diego Gas & Electric Company submitted an application to the United States Nuclear Regulatory Commission to construct two 974 MWe Westinghouse pressurized water reactors approximately 15 miles southwest of Blythe, California near the border of Arizona. The location of the proposed nuclear plant was 160 miles east of the city of San Diego, and the site had been cleared for general and earthquake safety by both state and federal regulators. The cost of the twin reactor plant was to be 3 billion dollars. The two reactors were scheduled to come on line in 1985 and 1988.

California had already enacted a state law in 1976 that mandated that a solution be found to the problem of safe disposal of nuclear waste before further nuclear plants could be constructed. Attempts to exempt the Sundesert plant from the law failed in what was then called the California Assembly's Resources, Land Use and Energy Committee.

Additionally, statewide public disapproval of nuclear power had increased significantly. In March 1978 in California’s Kern County, voters for the first time in United States history emphatically rejected a nuclear power plant, the proposed four-reactor San Joaquin Nuclear Project, by a 70% to 30% margin. If approved and constructed, it would have been the largest nuclear power facility in the world.

The next month, April 1978, a year before the Three Mile Island accident, Governor Brown stated he would never sign a bill allowing construction of a nuclear power plant in California. Soon afterwards the California Energy Commission voted to halt the construction of the two Sundesert units in the "absence of federally demonstrated and approved technology for permanent disposal of radioactive wastes". The Sundesert project was cancelled in May 1978.

== Aftermath ==
Political response to the crucial California Energy Commission vote to deny the Sundesert plant a permit was considerable from both parties. The body had been created in 1974, and all five members had been appointed by Governor Brown. There were calls to abolish the commission in the wake of the commission vote not to approve the plant.

The utility most involved with the plant construction, San Diego Gas and Electric with a 50% stake, had invested 100 million dollars in the failed project.

The rejection of the Sundesert plant was the last major effort to locate a new nuclear power plant in California. As of 2020, the final operational nuclear power plant in the state, the twin-reactor Diablo Canyon Power Plant facility midway between Los Angeles and San Francisco, was slated to be shut down no later than 2025, however the plant has been proposed for extended operation beyond that date.

== See also ==
- Anti-nuclear movement in California
- Bodega Bay Nuclear Power Plant
- Critical Masses: Opposition to Nuclear Power in California, 1958–1978
- Energy use in California
- Nuclear power in the United States
- List of canceled nuclear plants in the United States
