= Bodega Bay Nuclear Power Plant =

Proposed Northern California nuclear power facility

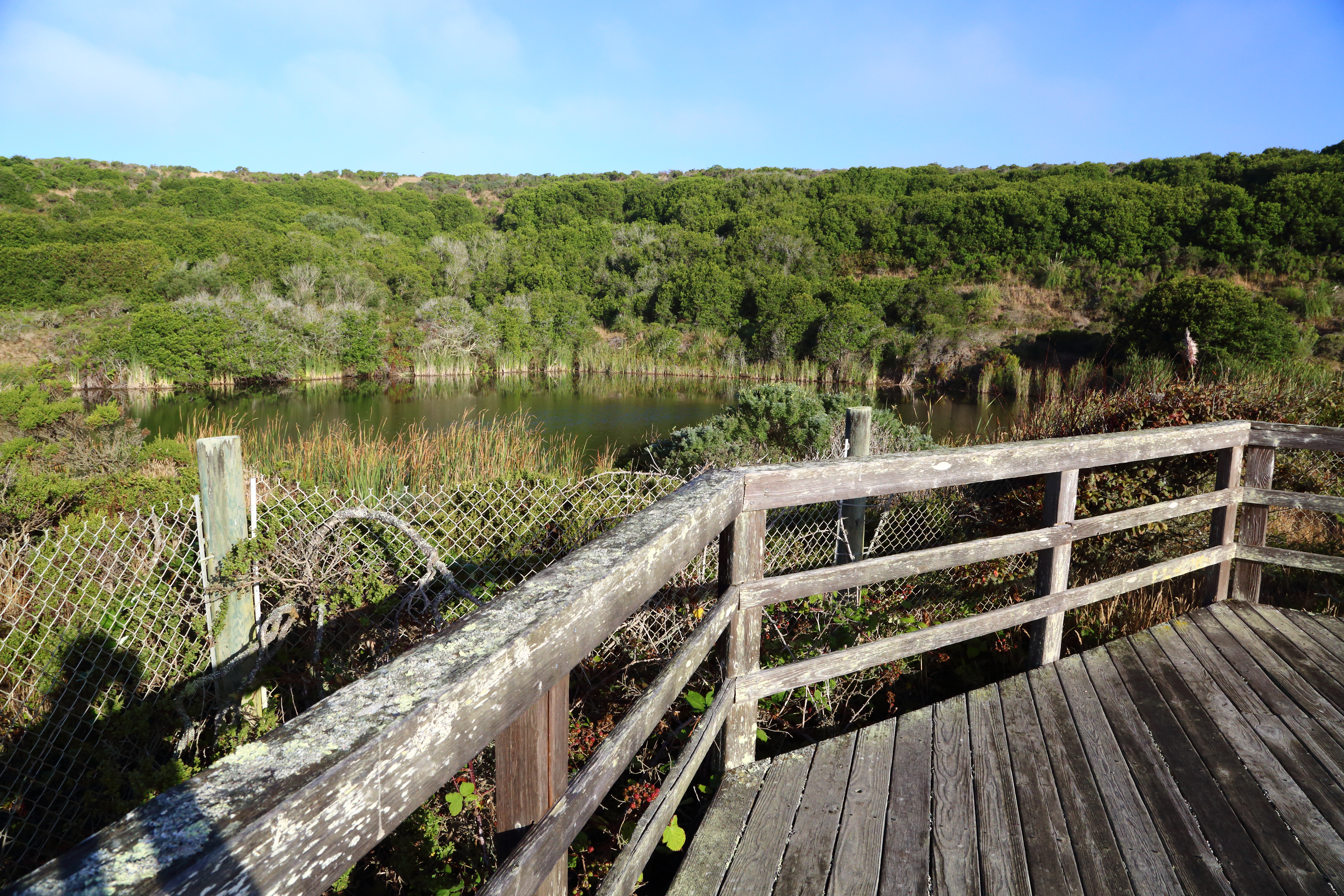
- Old foundation excavation at Bodega Bay Nuclear Power Plant site, locally called the "Hole in the Head"
- Country: United States
- Coordinates: 38°18′19″N 123°03′32″W
- Status: Cancelled

The Bodega Bay Nuclear Power Plant was a proposed Northern California nuclear power facility that was stopped by local activism in the 1960s and never built. The foundations, located 2 miles (3.2 km) west of the active San Andreas Fault, were being dug at the time the plant was cancelled. The action has been termed "the birth of the anti-nuclear movement."

== History ==
Pacific Gas & Electric planned to build the first commercially viable nuclear power plant in the US at Bodega Bay, California, a fishing village fifty miles north of San Francisco. The proposal was controversial and conflict with local citizens began in 1958.

The proposed plant site is close to the San Andreas Fault, a major active tectonic boundary, and in the region's environmentally sensitive fishing and dairy industries. Bodega Head sits on the Pacific Plate, while the town is on the North American Plate. Fishermen feared that the "plant's location and thermal discharge would interfere with their livelihood." Other citizens did not want their "simple isolated lifestyle" disturbed.

Bodega Bay resident Rose Gaffney, who owned acreage on the Bodega Head that PG&E needed to buy, sued the utility company to keep her land and invited government officials to see the fault lines on the proposed nuclear site. The Sierra Club became actively involved and opposed the choice of the site. The Secretary of the Interior, Stewart Udall, said he was "gravely concerned" about the Bodega site.

The Northern California Association to Preserve Bodega Head (NCAPBH) was formed and released press statements and submitted appeals to various state and federal bodies. In June 1963, NCAPBH organized a public meeting and 1,500 helium balloons were released into the air. They carried the message: "This balloon could represent a radioactive molecule of strontium 90 or iodine 131." These two substances had reached public prominence in the debate about fallout from nuclear weapons testing.

The conflict ended in 1964, when, following a negative review by the Atomic Energy Commission, Pacific Gas & Electric withdrew its application and canceled plans for the plant. By this point, a pit had been dug for the foundation, near the tip of Bodega Head; since the abandonment of the site, the pit has partially filled with water and become a pond, informally called the "Hole in the Head." Thomas Wellock traces the birth of the anti-nuclear movement to the controversy over Bodega Bay.

An attempt by the Los Angeles Department of Water and Power to build a nuclear power plant in Corral Canyon near Malibu, similar to that at Bodega Bay, was abandoned in 1970.

== See also ==
- Allens Creek Nuclear Power Plant
- Anti-nuclear movement in California
- Critical Masses: Opposition to Nuclear Power in California, 1958–1978
- Energy in California
- List of canceled nuclear plants in the United States
- Nuclear power in the United States
- Stanislaus Nuclear Power Plant
- Sundesert Nuclear Power Plant
- The Birds (1963) – an American natural horror-thriller film produced and directed by Alfred Hitchcock. Most of the film's exterior scenes were filmed around the two towns of Bodega (a small inland village) and Bodega Bay (a larger village on the bay).
