= Diablo Canyon earthquake vulnerability =

Environmental issue in California

Diablo Canyon (Nuclear) Power Plant, located in San Luis Obispo County California, was originally designed to withstand a 6.75 magnitude earthquake from four faults, including the nearby San Andreas Fault and Hosgri Fault, but was later upgraded to withstand a 7.5 magnitude quake. It has redundant seismic monitoring and a safety system designed to shut it down promptly in the event of significant ground motion.

In 2008 the Shoreline Fault, which passes less than a mile from the plant, was discovered. The fault has the potential of triggering a 6.5-magnitude earthquake. Because the Richter scale is logarithmic, Diablo Canyon is designed to withstand an earthquake of shaking amplitude ten times larger than that which the Shoreline fault is capable of triggering, based on an analysis by plant owner Pacific Gas & Electric (PG&E).

== Introduction ==
Diablo Canyon Power Plant (DCNPP/DCPP) is located proximal to the Los Osos, Hosgri, San Andreas and Shoreline faults. The discovery of these faults required design modifications during construction of the plant.

The Shoreline Fault is described in the November 2008 PG&E report as an "alignment of microseismicity subparallel to the coastline indicating the possible presence of a previously unidentified fault located about 1 km offshore of DCPP." The plant's current operating license expires in 2030 and, in the aftermath of the Tohoku earthquake and tsunami, there is renewed opposition due to public perception that the risk of earthquake or tsunami might make the plant unsafe. Re-licensing is contingent upon consistency with the Coastal Act and thus review by the California Coastal Commission, however seismic issues are more properly within the purview of the Nuclear Regulatory Commission. The NRC in June 2011 announced that it had already completed its Safety Evaluation Report (SER) for the plant. In July 2016 PG&E announced that it does not plan on relicensing either of its two Units.

== Public controversy ==
Critics contend that the Diablo Canyon (Nuclear) Power Plant was built so close to a set of geological fault lines that it is "for all practical purposes" to be regarded as built "directly over" a fault. They refer to the Hosgri fault, which was discovered while the plant was under construction. No scientific corroboration for these opinions has been presented, and PG&E maintains that "new and extensive scientific re-evaluations performed at the direction of the Nuclear Regulatory Commission (NRC) continue to show that Diablo Canyon can safely withstand earthquakes, tsunamis and flooding that could potentially occur in the region."

On July 15, 2011, PBS aired a 17-minute video documenting the controversy over the discovery of the Shoreline fault. It details the differences of opinion between PG&E and a USGS geologist who disagrees with PG&E's assessment of the length of the Shoreline fault, and the potential for shaking should slippage occur at the Hosgri/Shoreline faults simultaneously.

The documentary also prominently features former California Assemblyman Sam Blakeslee, who after discovery of the Shoreline fault introduced legislation mandating 3-D seismic studies. Blakeslee, a former employee of Exxon-Mobil and an outspoken critic of the seismic evaluation undertaken in-house by PG&E, has come under fire by the California Democratic Party for alleged ties to California's fossil fuel industry. The Party alleges Blakeslee "led the effort to insert offshore drilling rights along the Santa Barbara coast as part of [2009] state budget negotiations", and he "used his Assembly position to rake in more than $56,000 from his friends in Big Oil including Exxon, BP, Chevron and Valero".

According to the documentary, Blakeslee authored a bill in 2006 giving the California Energy Commission (CEC) "the power to assess the safety of [California's] nuclear plants", ostensibly to provide a seismic evaluation by an organization without involved financial interest. Others dispute CEC's impartiality. CEC Chairman Robert B. Weisenmiller co-founded and maintained a 24-year association with MRW & Associates, a company with areas of focus including "Fossil fuel generation", "Natural gas pipelines and storage", and "Liquified natural gas". On its website the company notes, "Because MRW maintains a singular focus on power and gas markets, we are ideally placed to help clients take advantage of the changes in market structure and industry regulation." Nuclear energy has been perceived by many as a barrier to the expanding role of natural gas as a fuel for generating electricity, due to nuclear's lack of carbon emissions.

== Geological perspectives ==
Three Pliocene-Miocene marine sedimentary units dominate the geology of Diablo Canyon: the Pismo Formation, the Monterey Formation, and the Obispo Formation. According to a Lawrence-Berkeley report entitled Geologic Investigation of a Potential Site for a Next-Generation Reactor Neutrino Oscillation Experiment – Diablo Canyon, San Luis Obispo County, CA the area is tectonically active, located east of the active Hosgri Fault and in the southern limb of the northwest trending Pismo Syncline." The Obispo Formation is made up of marine and volcaniclastic sedimentary rocks.

== Seismic source characterization studies ==
Various techniques are used to identify faults. These include:

- aeromagnetic survey
- marine magnetic survey
- seismic reflection profiling
- seismicity
- sub-bottom profiling
- geologic mapping
- geodetic survey
- gravity survey

In 1989, the USGS of the Department of Interior published a report titled "Empirical prediction of near-source ground motion for the Diablo Canyon power plant site, San Luis Obispo County, California". Though the report was a primarily deterministic (empirical) analysis, it included a 1000-point Monte Carlo simulation to demonstrate that seven principal coefficients of ground motion were statistically significant at the 90-percent confidence level. More recent studies include a probabilistic seismic hazard assessment. As a result of studies by PG&E, it is determined that "ground motions from strike-slip earthquakes along the Hosgri fault zone have decreased and the ground motions from the reverse-slip earthquakes on the Los Osos and San Luis Bay fault zones have remained about the same".

=== Shoreline Fault ===
The Shoreline Fault is a 25 km long vertical strike-slip fault, identified in 2008, which lies approximately three hundred meters from the Diablo Canyon Nuclear Power Plant in California. According to Pacific Gas & Electric, the fault may produce quakes up to 6.5 magnitude. Mandated three-dimensional seismic studies have not been yet completed, and are not prerequisites for reissuance of the operating licenses for the two onsite units.

== Safety ==
According to USGS seismologist, Jeanne L. Hardebeck, the Shoreline Fault has potential to trigger an earthquake of 6.4–6.8 magnitude, while the company asserts the facility is designed to withstand a 7.5 magnitude quake, and NRC's estimate of the risk each year of an earthquake intense enough to cause core damage to the reactor at Diablo Canyon was 1 in 23,810 according to an NRC study published in August 2010.

=== Preparedness ===
The Office of Nuclear Reactor Regulation of the Nuclear Regulatory Commission provides oversight of Incident response teams and assures provision of an appropriate Incident commander for all adverse events including earthquakes. The company does have in place the following measures:

- Severe Accident Management Guidelines (SAMG)
  - Controlling reactor coolant pressure and temp, containment pressure and H concentration
  - Flood containment
  - emergency steam injection into generators
- Extreme Damage Mitigation Guidelines
  - Spent fuel pool water replacement measures
  - Depressurization of steam generators
  - reduction of pressure w/o power
  - start diesel w/o power

=== Design basis ===
According to information provided by PG&E the plant is designed to accommodate a ground acceleration of 0.75 g – three quarters of gravity. By comparison, the ground tremors experienced by the Fukushima Daiichi power plant was reported as 0.2–0.51g, with the plant certified to withstand 0.18–0.36g. Subsequent inspection showed no significant damage to any of Fukushima Daiichi's four reactors from the earthquake, indicating all four reactors exceeded safety specifications by 0.02–0.15 g.

=== Tsunami ===
Diablo Canyon is designed to exceed a maximum oceanic flood level (combined tsunami, storm wave, high tide, and storm surge) of 32.0 feet above mean sea level (MSL) / 34.6 feet mean lower-low water (MLLW). The facility recently conducted a trial application of a Probabilistic Tsunami Hazard Assessment (PTHA) to evaluate lessons learned from the 2004 Sumatra tsunami as part of PG&E's Long-Term Seismic Plan (LTSP). This study shows that the hazard for tsunami waves of up to 3 meters (approximately 10 ft) is dominated by distant earthquakes around the circum-Pacific region, and is consistent with the historic record. The tsunami wave heights observed in San Luis Obispo County from the March 2011 Japanese tsunami were consistent with these results.

=== Soil liquefaction ===
Soil liquefaction resulting from earthquake activity has been raised as a concern however the plant and storage fuels are anchored on bedrock.

== Post-Fukushima developments ==
In April 2011, in the wake of the Fukushima nuclear incident in Japan, PG&E asked the NRC not to issue license renewals until PG&E can complete new seismic studies, which are expected to take at least three years. The ongoing (as of 6/2011) seismic studies were recommended by the California Energy Commission and are approved and funded by the California Public Utilities Commission.

On June 21, 2016, PG&E announced a Joint Proposal with labor and environmental organizations to increase investment in energy efficiency, renewables and storage, while phasing out nuclear power. Specifically, the operating licenses for Diablo Canyon Units 1 and 2 will not be renewed. These are set to expire on November 2, 2024, and August 26, 2025, respectively.

== See also ==
- Abalone Alliance
- Alliance for Nuclear Responsibility
- Dark Circle
- Diablo Canyon Power Plant
- Nuclear renaissance in the United States
- Pandora's Promise
- 1927 Lompoc earthquake
