= Craver =

Craver is a surname. Notable people with the surname include:

- Aaron Craver (born 1968), American football player
- Bill Craver (1844–1901), American baseball player
- Forrest Craver (1875–1958), American football player and coach and athletic director
- Harrison Warwick Craver (1875–1951), American librarian and educator
- Keyuo Craver (born 1980), American football player
- Margret Craver (1907–2010), American jeweler, metalsmith and arts educator
- Mario Craver (born 2006), American football player
- Nathaniel Craver (2002–2009), Russian child adopted by American citizens who were later convicted of involuntary manslaughter in his death
- Theodore F. Craver Jr., American businessman
