= San Onofre Nuclear Generating Station =

Nuclear power plant south of San Clemente, California

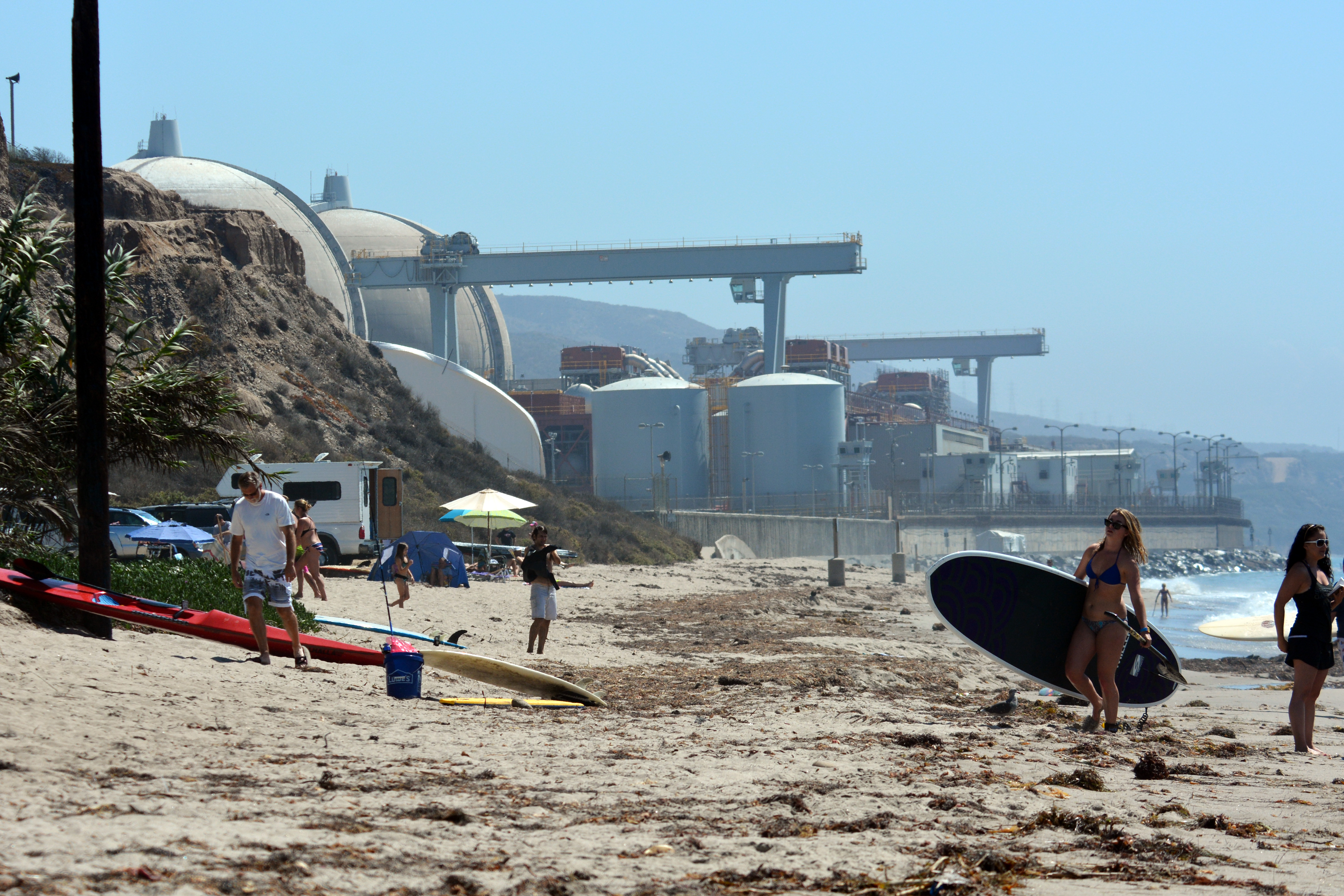
- The station as seen from the north.
- Location in San Diego County
- Country: United States
- Location: San Diego County, California
- Coordinates: 33°22′8″N 117°33′18″W
- Status: In decommissioning
- Construction began: August 1964
- Commission date: Unit 1: January 1, 1968; Unit 2: August 8, 1983; Unit 3: April 1, 1984
- Decommission date: Unit 1: November 30, 1992; Unit 2: Plan announced June 7, 2013; Unit 3: Plan announced June 7, 2013
- Construction cost: $8.968 billion (2007 USD, Units 2–3 only) ($13 billion in 2024 dollars)
- Owners: Southern California Edison (78.2%); San Diego Gas & Electric (20%); City of Riverside Utilities Department (1.8%)
- Operator: Southern California Edison

Nuclear power station
- Reactor type: PWR
- Reactor supplier: Westinghouse Electric Corporation (Unit 1); Combustion Engineering (Units 2 & 3)

Power generation
- Units decommissioned: 1 × 456 MW; 2 × 1127 MW
- Nameplate capacity: 2,254 MW

External links
- Website: songscommunity.com
- Commons: Related media on Commons

The San Onofre Nuclear Generating Station (SONGS) is a permanently closed nuclear power plant located south of San Clemente, California, on the Pacific coast, in Nuclear Regulatory Commission Region IV. The plant was shut down in 2013 after defects were found in replacement steam generators; it is currently in the process of being decommissioned. The 2.2 GW of electricity supply lost when the plant shut down was replaced with 1.8 GW from new natural-gas-fired power plants and 250 MW from energy-storage projects.

The plant is owned by Southern California Edison (SCE). Edison International, parent of SCE, holds 78.2% ownership in the plant; San Diego Gas & Electric, 20%; and the City of Riverside Utilities Department, 1.8%. When fully functional, it employed over 2,200 people. Located between the Pacific Ocean and the Surf Line, the station is a prominent landmark because of its twin hemispherical containment buildings which were designed to contain any fission products in the event of an incident.

The plant's first unit, Unit 1, operated from 1968 to 1992. Unit 2 was started in 1983 and Unit 3 started in 1984. Upgrades designed to last 20 years were made to the reactor units in 2009 and 2010; however, both reactors were shut down in January 2012 after premature wear was found on more than 3,000 tubes in replacement steam generators that had been installed in 2010 and 2011. The Nuclear Regulatory Commission investigated the events that led to the closure. In May 2013, Senator Barbara Boxer, the then-chairman of the Senate Environment and Public Works Committee, said the modifications had proved to be "unsafe and posed a danger to the eight million people living within 50 miles (80 km) of the plant," and she called for a criminal investigation.

In June 2013, Southern California Edison announced the permanent retirement of Unit 2 and Unit 3, citing "continuing uncertainty about when or if SONGS might return to service" and noting that ongoing regulatory and "administrative processes and appeals" would likely cause any tentative restart plans to be delayed for "more than a year". The company stated, "Full retirement of the units prior to decommissioning will take some years in accordance with customary practices. Actual decommissioning will take many years until completion." Concerns continue over Edison's plans for on-site dry cask storage of the considerable amount of nuclear waste created during the facility's decades of operation.

During its operation until 2012, SONGS provided about 20% of the power to large portions of Southern California.

== Description ==
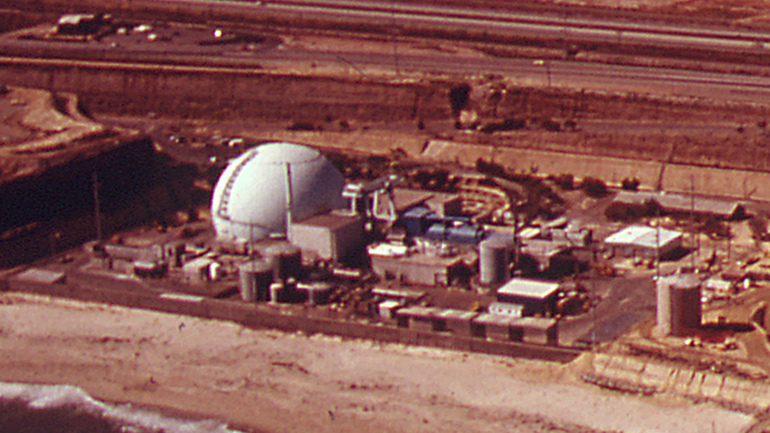
Unit 1 in 1975

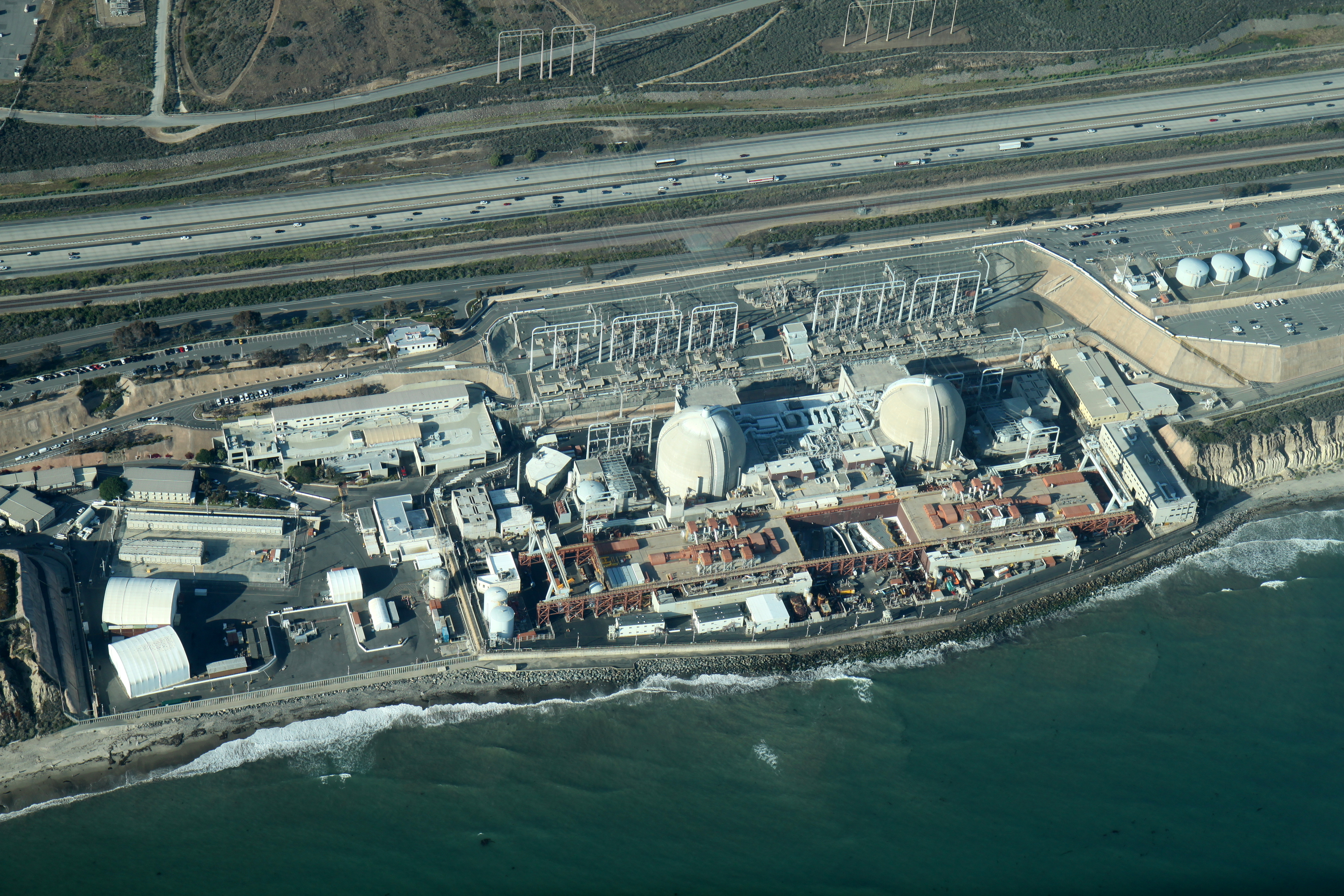
Units 2 and 3 in 2012

The San Onofre Nuclear Generating Station (SONGS), operated by Southern California Edison (SCE) is approximately 100 km (60 mi) south of Los Angeles, 6.5 km (4 mi) south of San Clemente, CA. It is located between the Surf Railroad Line and the Pacific Ocean within Marine Corps Base Camp Pendleton.

Unit 1 commenced operation in 1968, and shut down in 1992. Unit 1, a first-generation Westinghouse pressurized water reactor that operated for 25 years, closed permanently in 1992; it has been dismantled and is used as a storage site for spent fuel. It had a spherical containment of concrete and steel; the smallest wall was 6 feet (1.8 m) thick. It generated 456 MWe gross, and 436 MWe net, when operating at 100% capacity.

Units 2 and 3, Combustion Engineering two-loop pressurized water reactors, generated 1,127 MWe gross, and 1,070 MWe and 1,080 MWe net respectively, when operating at 100% capacity. Units 2 and 3 permanently ceased operations in June 2013.

In a ten-year project completed in 2011 and costing $671 million, Edison replaced the steam generators in both reactors with Mitsubishi steam generators of the modified design. Because of the reactors' two-loop design, uncommon for such large reactors of that era, the steam generators were among the largest in the industry. A common shortcoming of these large steam generators was tube wear, requiring replacement earlier than their 40-year design life. The steam generators being the largest components in the reactor required a temporary hole through the concrete containment shell. The Unit 2 replacement was completed in 2009 and Unit 3 in 2011. Edison estimated that the modernization would save customers $1 billion during the plant's license period, which at the time ran until 2022.

=== Unit 1 ===
Dismantlement of Unit 1 is essentially complete. The turbine building was removed and the licensee completed reactor pressure vessel internal segmentation and cutup; however, the licensee was unable to make arrangements for shipping the reactor pressure vessel to a disposal facility because of the size and weight of the vessel and shipping package. The licensee is making plans to ship the vessel offsite during the decommissioning activities for Units 2 and 3 because the radioactivity has decayed to a level that allows it to be treated as low level waste.

SONGS-1 was a Westinghouse 3-loop pressurized water reactor constructed by Bechtel and rated at 1347 MWthermal . It began commercial operation on January 1, 1968, and ceased operation on November 30, 1992. Defueling was completed on March 6, 1993. On December 28, 1993, NRC approved the Permanently Defueled Technical Specifications. On November 3, 1994, SCE submitted a Proposed Decommissioning Plan to place SONGS-1 in SAFSTOR until the shutdown of Units 2 and 3. On December 15, 1998, following a change in NRC decommissioning regulations, SCE submitted a post shutdown decommissioning activities report (PSDAR) for SONGS-1, to commence DECON in 2000. SCE actively decommissioned the facility, and most of the structures and equipment have been removed and sent to a disposal facility. The NRC issued a license amendment in February 2010 releasing the off-shore portions of the Unit 1 cooling intake and outlet pipes in place, under the Pacific Ocean seabed, for unrestricted use. The fuel from Unit 1 was transferred to Phase 1 of the independent spent fuel storage installation (ISFSI). In 2015, the ISFSI was expanded onto the area previously occupied by Unit 1 in order to store all Unit 2 and Unit 3 spent fuel. SCE completed transferring all of the nuclear fuel to dry storage in 2020.

The Unit 1 Reactor Pressure Vessel was transported via rail and then highway to the Energy Solutions disposal facility in Clive, Utah. The shipment left May 24, 2020 from San Onofre and arrived at the disposal facility on July 14, 2020.

== Safety issues ==
The San Onofre station had a range of technological problems over the years. In July 1982, Time wrote, "The firm Bechtel was ... embarrassed in 1977, when it installed a 420-ton nuclear-reactor vessel backwards" at San Onofre. In 2008, the San Onofre plant received multiple citations over issues such as failed emergency generators, improperly wired batteries and falsified fire safety data. In its annual review of 2011, the Nuclear Regulatory Commission (NRC) identified improvements but noted that in the area of human performance, "corrective actions to date have not resulted in sustained and measurable improvement".

According to the NRC, workers at San Onofre were "afraid they will be retaliated against if they bring up safety problems, something that's against the rules". As of 2011, according to the NRC, there had been progress on the issue and the problems were not considered a threat to the safety of plant workers or the public. In November 2011, there was an ammonia leak, and as a precaution company employees were evacuated from the leak area, while the units continued normal operation.

A mid-cycle inspection report spanning July 2011 to June 2012 revealed three incidents relating to human performance. An additional issue concerned a failure to develop procedures for a "cyber security analysis of electronic devices" that was later corrected.

In 2012, coolant fluid was found in the oil system of a backup diesel generator, which would have caused the generator to fail if needed. An internal investigation found "evidence of potential tampering", making sabotage by staff a possible cause.

=== Environmental risk and mitigation ===
Southern California Edison stated after the Fukushima disaster in 2011 that the station was "built to withstand a 7.0 magnitude earthquake directly under the plant". Additionally, there was a 25-foot wall (7.6 m) to protect the plant from a tsunami which could be potentially generated by the active fault 5 miles (8.0 km) offshore. The closest tectonic fault line is the Christianitos fault, less than a mile away, which is considered inactive or "dead", but other active faults in the vicinity might pose some threat.

The NRC's estimate of the yearly risk of an earthquake intense enough to cause core damage to the reactor at San Onofre was 1 in 58,824, according to a study it had published in August 2010.

In June 2012 S. David Freeman, the former head of the Southern California Public Power Authority and "a longtime anti-nuclear voice", described San Onofre and Diablo Canyon as "disasters waiting to happen: aging, unreliable reactors sitting near earthquake fault zones on the fragile Pacific Coast, with millions of Californians living nearby".

The San Onofre plant used seawater for cooling, like some other seaside facilities in Southern California, lacking the large cooling towers typically associated with nuclear generating stations. Limited available land next to SONGS would likely have required towers to be built on the opposite side of Interstate 5.

=== Surrounding population ===
The NRC defines two emergency planning zones around nuclear power plants: 1) a plume exposure pathway zone with a radius of 10 miles (16 km), concerned primarily with exposure to, and inhalation of, airborne radioactive contamination, and 2) an ingestion pathway zone of about 50 miles (80 km), concerned primarily with ingestion of food and liquid contaminated by radioactivity. The average prevailing westerly wind direction at San Onofre blows inland 9 months of the year.

The 2010 U.S. population within 10 miles (16 km) of San Onofre was 92,687, an increase of 50.0 percent in a decade, according to an analysis of U.S. Census data for msnbc.com. The 2010 U.S. population within 50 miles (80 km) was 8,460,508, an increase of 14.9 percent since 2000. Three of the cities within 20 miles of the facility are San Clemente and Laguna Beach in Orange County and Oceanside in San Diego County. San Diego is 45 miles south of the facility, and Los Angeles is 60 miles north of the facility.

== Anti-nuclear protests, 1977–present ==
On August 6, 1977, about a thousand anti-nuclear protesters marched outside the nuclear generation station, while units 2 & 3 were under construction.

On March 11, 2012, more than 200 activists protested at the San Onofre Nuclear Generating Station to mark the one-year anniversary of the Fukushima Daiichi nuclear disaster. Two Japanese residents who lived through the Fukushima meltdowns and one-time congressional candidate Raymond Lutz spoke, saying the generators, which had been offline since January 2012, should remain off. In May 2012, environmental and anti-nuclear activists gathered at Southern California Edison's Irvine headquarters calling for the San Onofre plant to be decommissioned.

== Shutdown (2012) and closure (2013) ==
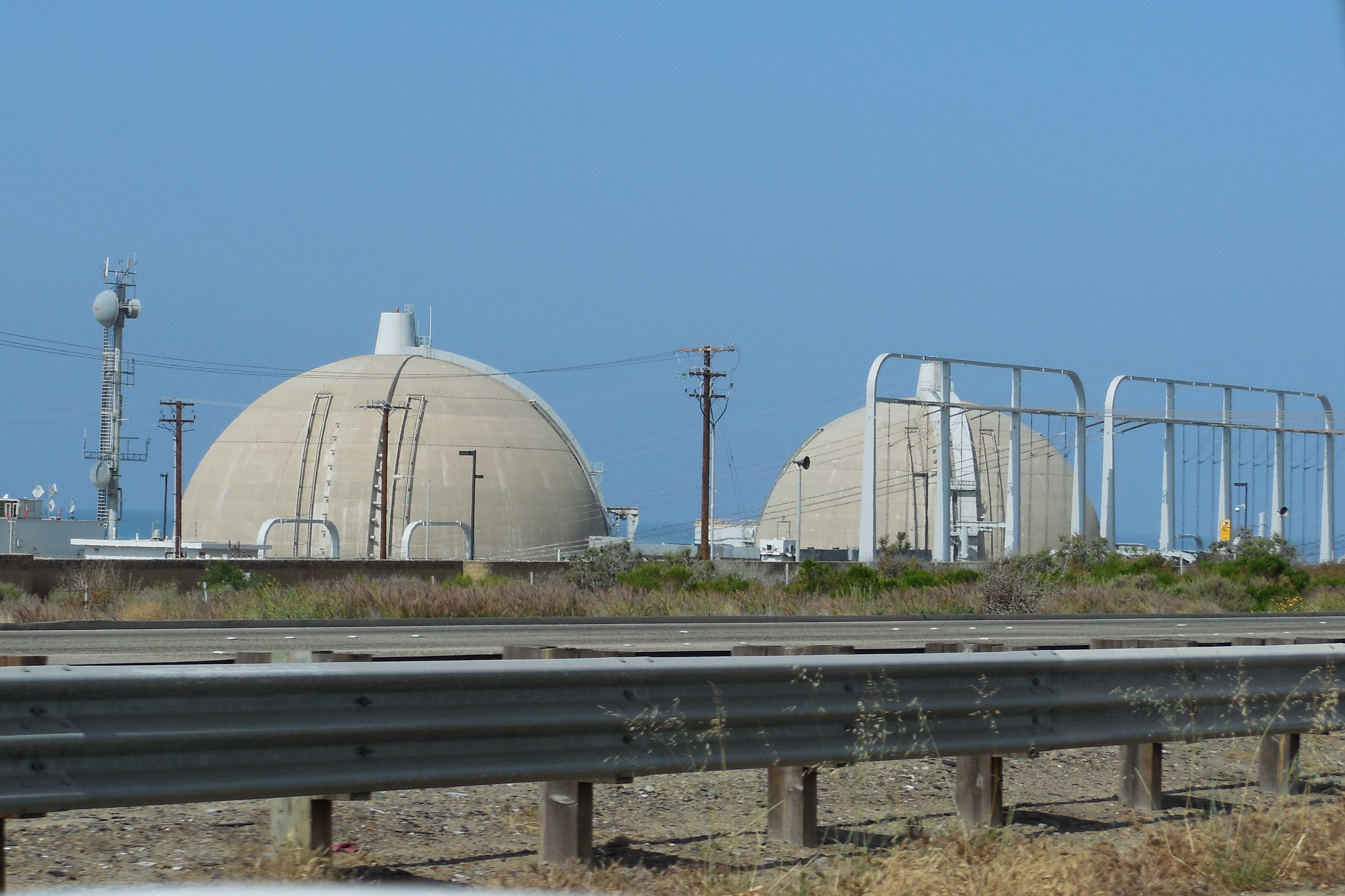
Units 2 and 3 after shutdown.

=== Initial shutdown ===
Unit 2 was shut down in early January 2012 for routine refueling and replacement of the reactor vessel head. On January 31, 2012, Unit 3 suffered a radioactive leak largely inside the containment shell, with a release to the environment below allowable limits, and the reactor was shut down per standard procedure. On investigation, the replacement steam generators from 2011 in both units were found to show premature wear on over 3,000 tubes, in 15,000 places. Plant officials pledged not to restart until the causes of the tube leak and tube degradation were understood. Neither unit was ever restarted. There were no blackouts due to the lack of SONGS electricity; more pollution was caused by the use of natural gas plants to make up for the lost power generation, and additional cost led to higher utility bills.

=== NRC, SCE and public response ===
In March 2012, the NRC forbade the plant to be reopened until the causes of its equipment problems were thoroughly understood and fixed. At the same time, Irvine Councilman Larry Agran called for the plant to be decommissioned safely and as soon as possible. Concerns included "nuclear waste stored at the plant, health hazards from radioactive material, and inadequate evacuation plans". Resolutions passed in neighboring cities Laguna Beach and San Clemente called for safer and more secure nuclear waste storage. San Clemente voted to request public information about radiation levels near the plant. The spokesman for Edison International said "the company will work to prepare detailed responses to council and community member questions and concerns".

In June 2012 the environmental group Friends of the Earth filed a legal petition with the NRC, asking that any decision to restart SONGS be considered a de facto NRC license amendment which required a public hearing, rather than a decision by the NRC commissioners. Friends of the Earth submitted evidence and sworn statements of John Large of the London-based nuclear consulting engineers Large & Associates, demonstrating that the steam generating tube degradation was a generic fault of the Mitsubishi design and that Edison's power derating of the two nuclear units would not lower the rate of wear or the risk of catastrophic tube failure. SCE and NRC staff filed statements opposing the petition.

In July 2012, the NRC's final report identified ten issues that needed followup and stated "the plant will not be permitted to restart until the licensee has developed a plan to prevent further steam generator tube degradation and the NRC independently verifies that it can be operated safely." As of July 2012, the cost related to the shutdown had reached $165 million, with $117 million of that being the purchasing of power from other sources to replace the output of the plant. The Chairman of Edison International Ted Craver stated the possibility that reactor 3 might be scrapped as "It is not clear at this time whether Unit 3 will be able to restart without extensive additional repairs".

In August 2012, Southern California Edison announced plans to lay off one-third, or 730, of the plants employees; the company said that the downsizing had been planned more than two years before. Rochelle Becker of the Alliance for Nuclear Responsibility said the layoffs showed that the company was not honest about their plans for the power plant.

In September 2012, Allison Macfarlane, the NRC Chairwoman, said that the plant would be down for a prolonged period, and that Unit 3 would be defueled in September 2012 because the unit had been significantly damaged. Due to the shutdown, the NRC ended requirements to monitor non-operating systems.

In October 2012, SCE submitted a "Unit 2 Return to Service Report" about corrective actions, such as plugging worn tubes and preventively plugged additional tubes. It proposed a restart limiting Unit 2 to 70% power, to prevent excessive tube vibration, until an inspection within 150 days of operation. SCE reported that most of the excessive wear had been in limited areas, due to higher speed and drier steam than computer modeling had predicted, and inadequate tube support at the U-bend. Analysis had concluded operating at 70% power would eliminate the conditions that caused excessive wear.

In November 2012, the NRC decided to refer the Friends of the Earth hearing request to the Atomic Safety and Licensing Board. By November 2012, the cost of the outage was over $300 million, and discussion of restarting Unit 2 had been postponed.

In December 2012, the last of the four old steam generators was transported to Clive, Utah for disposal. Total greenhouse gas emissions from power plants in California increased by 35% from 2011 to 2012, according to figures from the California Air Resources Board, which per the World Nuclear News is partly due to the early closure of San Onofre.

In February 2013, the NRC asked the steam generator manufacturer Mitsubishi Heavy Industries to provide a redacted version of a report on the plant's steam generators for publication. The report described the changes made in the replacement steam generator including the removal of a support cylinder, changes to the tube support plates and anti-vibration bars, and addition of about 400 tubes.

In December 2013, the NRC cited SONGS for failing to properly check the steam generator design, which had caused the plant shutdown. The finding did not carry any fine or penalty but complicated SCE's legal position that they did nothing wrong. The California Public Utilities Commission was considering whether to order a multimillion-dollar refund to SCE customers.

=== Atomic Safety and Licensing Board ruling, May 2013 ===
On May 13, 2013, the Atomic Safety and Licensing Board issued its decision on the Friends of the Earth hearing request filed in June 2012. It determined the current NRC process on this issue constituted a de facto license amendment requiring an adjudicatory public hearing, for three independent reasons:

1. the SCE proposal to limit unit 2 to 70% power is inconsistent with the license, so constitutes an amendment;
2. unit 2 cannot safely operate within the full license scope, so the license needs to be amended;
3. restarting the plant with the steam generator tubes in the current degraded state is outside historical experience, and the proposal to operate them at 70% power for a limited duration before reinspection constituted the regulatory definition of "tests or experiments", requiring a license amendment.

In May 2013, Senator Barbara Boxer asked that the United States Justice Department investigate possible malfeasance by Edison officials, and released a 2004 letter by an Edison executive that expressed worries that the new steam generators, though similar, would not be "like for like" replacements and could lead to the same kind of potential "disastrous" issues that in fact led to the plant's shutdown in 2012. In making the request for a possible criminal investigation, Boxer stated "This correspondence leads me to believe that Edison intentionally misled the public and regulators in order to avoid a full safety review and public hearing in connection with its redesign of the plant." Edison denied any wrongdoing. but reportedly signaled it might shut the plant down for good should the company not be allowed to restart one of the reactors at 70% of capacity.

=== Plant closure, June 2013 ===
On June 7, 2013, Southern California Edison announced it would "permanently retire" Unit 2 and Unit 3, ending their attempt to restart the plant at a reduced capacity. The utility said it would cut the SONGS workforce from about 1,500 to some 400 employees, with most reductions "expected to occur in 2013". The company also said it would "pursue recovery of damages from Mitsubishi Heavy Industries, the supplier of the replacement steam generators", although the contract limited liability to $138 million and excluded consequential damages. The chief executive of Edison International explained that the current licenses expire in 2022, and with post-Fukushima requirements, which include re-evaluating earthquake vulnerability, it was uncertain renewal would be economic, so it made little sense making costly and politically difficult repairs now that would not make a return on investment before 2022.

California Senator Dianne Feinstein signaled approval of the decision to permanently close the plant, stating "I firmly believe this is the right thing to do for the more than 7 million Californians who live within 50 miles of San Onofre." However, Representative Darrell Issa, whose voting district includes the nuclear station, was more downbeat, saying "our communities now face the loss of employment for more than a thousand highly skilled workers and an essential local source of low-cost, clean energy." Issa also pledged to work to improve the prospects for nuclear power nationwide. In contrast, Sierra Club Director Kathryn Phillips applauded the move, saying in a statement that "We hope, especially, that the utilities will take this opportunity to help get more locally generated renewable energy, such as rooftop solar, into their portfolios."

In 2015, State Attorney General Kamala Harris opened an investigation of the Office of Ratepayer Advocates, San Diego Gas and Electric, and Southern California Edison. California state investigators searched the home of California utility regulator Michael Peevey and found hand written notes, which showed that Peevey had met with an Edison executive in Poland, where the two had negotiated the terms of the San Onofre settlement leaving San Diego taxpayers with a $3.3 billion bill to pay for the closure of the plant. The investigation was closed amid Harris's 2016 run for the US Senate position, which opened when Barbara Boxer retired.

=== Decommissioning, 2014–present ===
Decommissioning San Onofre will take numerous years until the process is complete. In February 2014 SCE announced that it would be auctioning off non-radioactive equipment from the former nuclear plant March 2015. In August 2014, SCE announced decommissioning would take 20 years, cost $4.4 billion and spent fuel would be held on-site in dry casks indefinitely, while Low Level Radioactive Waste would be disposed in Texas and Utah. On December 20, 2016, SCE announced it had selected a joint venture of AECOM and EnergySolutions as decommissioning general contractor for SONGS.

=== Nuclear waste issue ===
Since the Yucca Mountain nuclear waste repository plan was terminated in 2008, nuclear waste will have to be stored on site in San Onofre until Congress finds another location for a nuclear waste repository.

SONG's nuclear waste is in steel-lined concrete pools known as wet storage. According to the NRC, nuclear waste must sit in these pools for about 5 years in order to cool. It then must be transferred into a more permanent, dry storage, consisting of 80 underground steel lined concrete monoliths.

SCE decided on Holtec International to design the dry storage canisters. The canisters will be 5/8 inch (16 mm) thick compared to the 1/2 inch (13 mm) thickness used for most other canisters in the US. These steel-lined concrete monoliths next to the Pacific Ocean exceed California's earthquake requirements and Edison says they are designed to withstand fire and tsunamis.

The Electric Power Research Institute (EPRI) will be using new technologies in order to detect and protect these canisters from cracking. EPRI believes the best method for chloride-induced stress-corrosion cracking is to apply proactive practices, which include using standard methods to classify the corrosivity of the site environment, monitoring the site-specific absolute humidity, and planning for visual inspection of the canister surface in a timeframe based on the results.

In April 2017 Southern California Edison agreed to move spent nuclear fuel off the site, following legal action by San Diego environmental group Citizens Oversight.

In July 2020, the California Coastal Commission approved an inspection and maintenance program that will allow Southern California Edison to continue to store spent nuclear fuel in a storage site at San Onofre.

More than 1,400 tonnes (1,400 long tons; 1,500 short tons) of spent nuclear fuel are stored at San Onofre. Concerns continue over Edison's plans for on-site dry cask storage of the considerable amount of nuclear waste created during the facility's decades of operation.

=== Financial settlement ===
In July 2013 SCE started a 90-day dispute resolution process with Mitsubishi Heavy Industries (MHI). The dispute resolution was unsuccessful, so a binding arbitration process run by the International Chamber of Commerce commenced in October 2013. SCE claimed $7.57 billion (930 billion yen), but MHI argues that compensation is limited to $137 million by their contract.

In October 2015 the owners reached a $400 million settlement with their insurers for outages caused by the failure. SCE received $312.8 million, SDG&E $80 million, and the city of Riverside $7.16 million. The arbitration claim against MHI continued to be pursued through the International Chamber of Commerce.

In March 2017 the International Chamber of Commerce ordered MHI to pay $125 million compensation, the liability limit contained in the contract. The tribunal rejected claims of fraud and gross negligence against Mitsubishi, and ordered the claimants to pay MHI $58 million in legal fees and costs.

== In popular culture ==
People in Southern California have referred to, or related the structures of, San Onofre Nuclear Generation Station to Dolly Parton.

The domes of the San Onofre Nuclear Generating Station were the inspiration for the Volcano House at Newberry Springs, Southern California, a domed mid-century modern house designed in 1968.

The San Onofre Nuclear Generating Station is shown in the 1987 film Made in U.S.A. directed by Ken Friedman and starring Adrian Pasdar, Chris Penn and Lori Singer. SONGS was also featured in Godfrey Reggio's 1982 experimental film Koyaanisqatsi, where sunbathers are shown on San Onofre State Beach in front of the station. Passing reference is made to the design of the containment shields (which resemble breasts) in the lyrics of the Descendents song "Kids" from their 1986 album Enjoy!, and in the comedy The Naked Gun (1988).

The nuclear generating station was also used as a backdrop for the nondescript Californian nuclear reactor in the film Cloud Atlas (2012).

Unit 1 was shown in a season 2 episode of Batman in 1967, "The Mad Hatter Runs Afoul".

It is also shown in the 2017 series Animal Kingdom as the backdrop to several surf scenes.

In the 2010 series The Event the powerplant was a target for the theft of fuel rods by extraterrestrials to use as fuel to teleport more of their people to Earth.

== See also ==
- Anti-nuclear movement in California
- Nuclear power in the United States
- Diablo Canyon Power Plant
- List of largest power stations in the United States
