= Anti-nuclear movement in California =

Anti-nuclear social movement, California, U.S.

The 1970s proved to be a pivotal period for the anti-nuclear movement in California. Opposition to nuclear power in California coincided with the growth of the country's environmental movement. Opposition to nuclear power increased when President Richard Nixon called for the construction of 1000 nuclear plants by the year 2000.

The movement succeeded in blocking plans to build a large number of facilities in the state as well as closing operating power plants. The confrontation between nuclear power advocates and environmentalists grew to include the use of non-violent civil disobedience.

In 1976 the state of California placed a moratorium on new reactors until a solution to radioactive waste disposal was in place, and two years later state politicians canceled the proposed Sundesert Nuclear Power Plant. In September 1981, over 1,900 arrests took place during a ten-day blockade at Diablo Canyon Power Plant. As part of a national anti-nuclear weapons movement Californians passed a 1982 statewide initiative calling for the end of nuclear weapons. In 1984, the Davis City Council declared the city to be a nuclear free zone.

In 2013, San Onofre Nuclear Generating Station Units 2 and 3 were permanently closed, ending nuclear power in Southern California. The state's final two operating reactors at Diablo Canyon were scheduled to close no later than 2025 until the enactment of 2021-22 Senate Bill 846 (Dodd), extending the plant's operations through 2030.

== Early conflicts ==
The birth of the anti-nuclear movement in California can be traced to controversy over Pacific Gas and Electric Company's attempt to build the nation's first commercially viable nuclear power plant in Bodega Bay. This conflict began in 1958 and ended in 1964, with the forced abandonment of these plans. Subsequent plans to build a nuclear power plant in Malibu were also abandoned.

== 1970s and 1980s ==
- Nuclear power plants in California
- Active plants
- Closed plants

As the anti-nuclear movement grew in California, some scientists and engineers began supporting the positions of the activists. They were influenced by the environmental and anti-Vietnam War movements that had inspired activists and had impacted the public consciousness. Californians for Nuclear Safeguards succeeded in placing Proposition 15 on the ballot in June 1976, which would have banned new nuclear power plants and put additional safety requirements on operating reactors. The initiative failed to pass after the nuclear industry spent millions of dollars to influence the outcome. However, as a result of the increased attention on safety issues, which included the resignation of three General Electric nuclear engineers, the California state legislature passed a moratorium on further nuclear development until a permanent solution to high level waste was in place.

The discovery of an earthquake fault near General Electric's Vallecitos Nuclear Center near Pleasanton resulted in the Nuclear Regulatory Commission closing the facility in 1977.

Anti-nuclear groups campaigned to stop construction of several proposed plants in the 1970s, especially those located on the coast and near fault lines. These proposals included the San Joaquin Nuclear Project, overwhelmingly rejected by Kern County voters in March 1978 by a 70–30% margin. A few months later, the proposed Sundesert Nuclear Power Plant was denied a permit by the California Energy Commission, which refused to allow the San Diego Gas & Electric Company to begin construction of the Sundesert units in the "absence of federally demonstrated and approved technology for permanent disposal of radioactive wastes".

=== Protests over Diablo Canyon ===
Specific protests included:

- August 6, 1977: The Abalone Alliance held the first blockade at Diablo Canyon Power Plant, and 47 people were arrested.
- August 1978: Nearly 500 people were arrested for protesting at Diablo Canyon.
- April 8, 1979: Ten days after the Three Mile Island accident in Pennsylvania, 30,000 people marched in San Francisco to support shutting down the Diablo Canyon Power Plant.
- June 30, 1979: 40,000 people attended a protest rally at Avila Beach in San Luis Obispo, near Diablo Canyon. Governor Jerry Brown spoke out forcefully against the plant.
- September 1981: Over a two-week period, 1,900 activists were arrested at Diablo Canyon Power Plant. It was the largest number of arrests in the history of the anti-nuclear movement in the United States.
- May 1984: About 130 demonstrators showed up for start-up day at Diablo Canyon, and five were arrested.

During this period there were controversies within the Sierra Club about how to lead the anti-nuclear movement, and this led to a split over the Diablo Canyon plant which ended in success for the utilities. The split led to the formation of Friends of the Earth, led by David Brower.

=== Rancho Seco and San Onofre power plants ===
In 1979, Abalone Alliance members held a 38-day sit-in in Californian Governor Jerry Brown's office to protest continued operation of Rancho Seco Nuclear Generating Station, which was a duplicate of the Three Mile Island facility. In 1989, Sacramento voters voted to shut down the Rancho Seco power plant. The salient issues were mostly economic; the plant kept breaking down, and it had been shut from late 1985 to early 1988 for repairs, forcing the district to buy electricity from neighbors.

On June 22, 1980, about 15,000 people attended a protest rally organized by the Southern California Alliance for Survival near the San Onofre Nuclear Generating Station. The featured speaker was physicist Michio Kaku, who pointed out that the Bechtel Corporation had installed the power plant's reactor pressure vessel backwards, and led the crowd in chants of "Governor Brown, shut it down!"

California has banned the approval of new nuclear reactors since the late 1970s because of concerns over waste disposal.

=== Documentary film ===
Dark Circle is a 1982 American documentary film that focuses on the connections between the nuclear weapons and the nuclear power industries, with a strong emphasis on the individual human and protracted U.S. environmental costs involved. A clear point made by the film is that while only two bombs were dropped on Japan, many hundreds were exploded in the United States. The film won the Grand Prize for documentary at the Sundance Film Festival and received a national Emmy Award for "Outstanding individual achievement in news and documentary".

The film shows anti-nuclear protest activities directed at the Diablo Canyon Power Plant on the California coast in the US. The protesters contend, and the movie supports, the assertion that the protests were responsible for delaying the licensing of the Diablo Canyon Power Plant and, as a result of the delay, the uncovering of serious construction errors was made public just before the plant went online and started producing power. For example, earthquake supports for nuclear piping had been installed backwards, and the film includes close up footage of the moment that this information became known.

== 1990s ==
On June 15, 1990, the Bureau of Land Management published the draft Environmental Impact Statement (DEIS) for the construction of a low-level nuclear waste repository to be located at Ward Valley California. The company applying to construct and operate the repository was U.S. Ecology. An eight-year struggle between government agencies and opponents of the nuclear waste dump ended with the dump being blocked.

== Nuclear-free communities ==
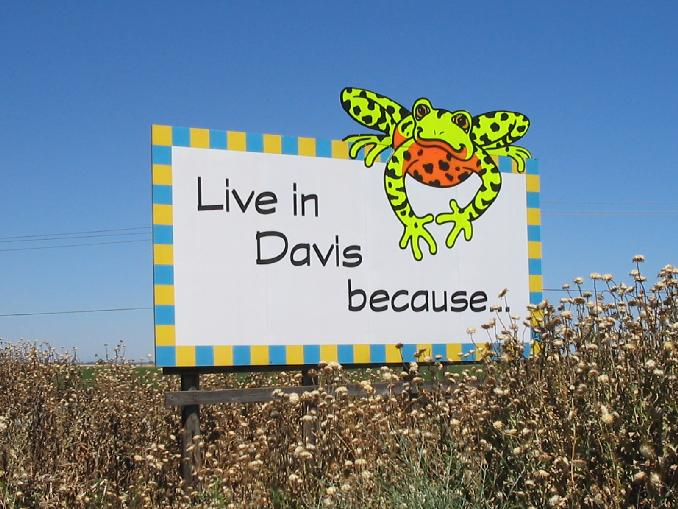
A set of two billboards in Davis, California, advertising its nuclear-free policy

On November 14, 1984, the Davis City Council declared the city to be a nuclear free zone.

== Recent developments ==
PG&E announced its decision to pursue license renewal for Diablo Canyon in November 2009, and local officials "came out in support because of the economic importance of the plant and its 1,200 employees and $25 million in annual property taxes". However, local anti-nuclear activists oppose renewal and want PG&E to focus more on renewable energy. They are also concerned "about the seismic safety of the plant given the recent discovery of a new earthquake fault nearby".

In April 2011, there was a rally of 300 people at Avila Beach calling for the closure of the Diablo Canyon nuclear power plant and a halt to its relicensing application process. The event was organized by the San Luis Obispo-based anti-nuclear group Mothers for Peace in response to the Fukushima nuclear disaster in Japan.

In 2013, San Onofre units 2 and 3 were permanently closed.

In June 2016, Pacific Gas and Electric announced plans to retire the Diablo Canyon Power Plant after its current U.S. Nuclear Regulatory Commission operating licenses expire in November 2024 and August 2025.

== See also ==
- Anti-nuclear groups in the United States
- Anti-nuclear protests in the United States
- California electricity crisis
- J. Samuel Walker
- Nuclear power debate
- Nuclear-free zone
- Politics of New England
- Renewable energy in the United States
- Santa Susana Field Laboratory
- Solar power in California
- Wind power in California
