= Abalone Alliance =

- Formation: 1977
- Type: Nonviolent civil disobedience group
- Purpose: Opposition to nuclear power
- Headquarters: San Luis Obispo & San Francisco
- Location: California

The Abalone Alliance (1977–1985) was a nonviolent civil disobedience group formed to shut down the Pacific Gas and Electric Company's Diablo Canyon Power Plant near San Luis Obispo on the central California coast in the United States. They modeled their affinity group-based organizational structure after the Clamshell Alliance which was then protesting the Seabrook Nuclear Power Plant in coastal New Hampshire. The group of activists took the name "Abalone Alliance" referring to the tens of thousands of wild California Red Abalone that were killed in 1974 in Diablo Cove when the unit's plumbing had its first hot flush.

The Abalone Alliance staged blockades and occupations at the Diablo Canyon Power Plant site between 1977 and 1984. Nearly 2,000 people were arrested during a two-week blockade in 1981, exceeding Seabrook as the largest number arrested at an anti-nuclear protest in the United States.

== History ==
The Diablo Canyon controversy started in 1963 when PG&E scrapped its attempt to build the Bodega Bay Nuclear Power Plant at Bodega Head, 71 miles north of San Francisco. The Bodega struggle started in 1958, but was opposed by a group led by a University of California professor and young Sierra Club activist named David Pessonen. This was the first anti-nuclear power campaign in the US. The main reason that the facility wasn't built was due its location less than 1,000 feet from the fault zone that struck San Francisco in 1906.

Rather than face public opposition at Diablo Canyon, PG&E approached the Sierra Club's president and cut a deal with certain board members where Diablo would be chosen rather than the Nipomo Dunes area. The wife of the Sierra Club president, who worked out the deal, would then be elected to PG&E's board of directors. As part of the plan, the decision was made when Sierra Club board member Martin Litton was out of the country, the only member who knew of Diablo's history and importance. The board was flown down to see the site in Frank Sinatra's Lear Jet with Danny Kaye on board providing entertainment. Kaye would later become opposed to nuclear power.

The Sierra Club president forbade any chapter from opposing Diablo Canyon, so The San Luis Obispo Chapter formed the Shoreline Preservation Conference to oppose the construction on the grounds that the area had been proposed as a state park, was a sacred Chumash Indian site, had some of the largest oak trees on the West Coast, was located on the second-to-last coastal wilderness area in California, and could be sitting on the fault that lightly shook Santa Barbara in a 1927 earthquake. The internal dispute over Diablo Canyon was a primary reason for the split-up of the Sierra Club, that led to the formation of Friends of the Earth by David Brower.

In 1965, the Shoreline Preservation Conference demanded that regulators investigate the danger of faults near the proposed site, but was ignored. In 1972, a Los Angeles reporter discovered a report by Shell Oil Company geologists completed prior to construction of Diablo Canyon Power Plant of the existence of the Hosgri Fault 2 1/2 miles offshore from the facility. As a result of the discovery, regulators forced PG&E to redesign and reinforce the facility.

== Diablo Canyon protests ==
During the late 1970s, the Abalone Alliance organized protests in San Luis County and regularly picketed PG&E offices across the state. The Alliance published a newspaper, It's About Times, which provided a forum for activist debate. Separate groups within the Abalone coalition "developed their own foci and protest styles".

On August 7, 1977, 1,500 people demonstrated at the gate of Diablo Canyon, resulting in 47 arrests. The next year, 5,000 people rallied and 487 were arrested. On September 10, 1981, the Abalone Alliance occupied the site, leading to 1,960 arrests. Nearly 30,000 people showed up in support. The protest motivated lawsuits seeking damages from the protest organizers.

At the end of the ten-day action in 1981, a 25-year-old engineer discovered a mirror image reversal in the seismic blueprints. PG&E was forced spend $3 billion and three additional years of repairs before reopening. Anti-War Activists Daniel Ellsberg and Tom Hayden, activist stars like Ed Asner, Martin Sheen, Martin Landau, Blythe Danner, Patti Davis, Robin Williams, Lily Tomlin, Harrison Ford, Carrie Fisher, Marsha Mason, John Belushi, Jane Fonda and Robert Blake and performers such as Jackson Browne, Bonnie Raitt, Crosby, Stills, Nash & Young, The Eagles, Linda Ronstadt, Peter Yarrow, Holly Near, Joan Baez, Dan Fogelberg, Bruce Springsteen and the E Street Band, James Taylor, Carly Simon, Chaka Khan, The Doobie Brothers, Jesse Colin Young, Stevie Wonder, Gil Scott-Heron, Stevie Nicks, Tom Petty, Poco, Wavy Gravy, Warren Zevon and others joined the anti-nuclear concerts, protests and larger movement – which included a series of concerts at Madison Square Garden through Musicians United for Safe Energy, as well as 'Peace Sunday' at the Rose Bowl (with over 100,000 in attendance) and multiple 'Survival Sundays' held at the Hollywood Bowl both through the Alliance for Survival, a Los Angeles-based Abalone Alliance affiliate. A number of the high-profile participants were included in the arrests at Diablo and the mass jailings were described as a "tornado of talent". Jackson Browne defending his civil disobedience at a San Luis Obispo courthouse after his arrest for trespassing at the blockade (“I consider my actions to be patriotic”). In 1984, the Alliance organized the Peoples Emergency Response Plan, where affinity groups blockaded at the Diablo Gates over a four-month period.

== See also ==
- Alliance for Nuclear Responsibility
- Anti-nuclear movement in the United States
- Shad Alliance
- Anti-nuclear protests in the United States
- Diablo Canyon earthquake vulnerability
- Great Peace March for Global Nuclear Disarmament
- Mothers for Peace
- Musicians United for Safe Energy

== Films ==
Dark Circle, Dir. Chris Beaver, Ruth Landy and Judy Irving, 1982, won the Grand Prize at the Sundance Film Festival in 1983 as well as an Emmy Award for "Outstanding Individual Achievement in News and Documentary" in 1990.

A Question of Power, Dir. David L. Brown, Prod. by David L. Brown, Tom Anderson and Jane Kinzler, 1986

No Nukes Dir. Daniel Goldberg, Anthony Potenza Prod. Julian Schlossberg, 1980
