= Diablo Canyon Power Plant =

Nuclear power plant in California

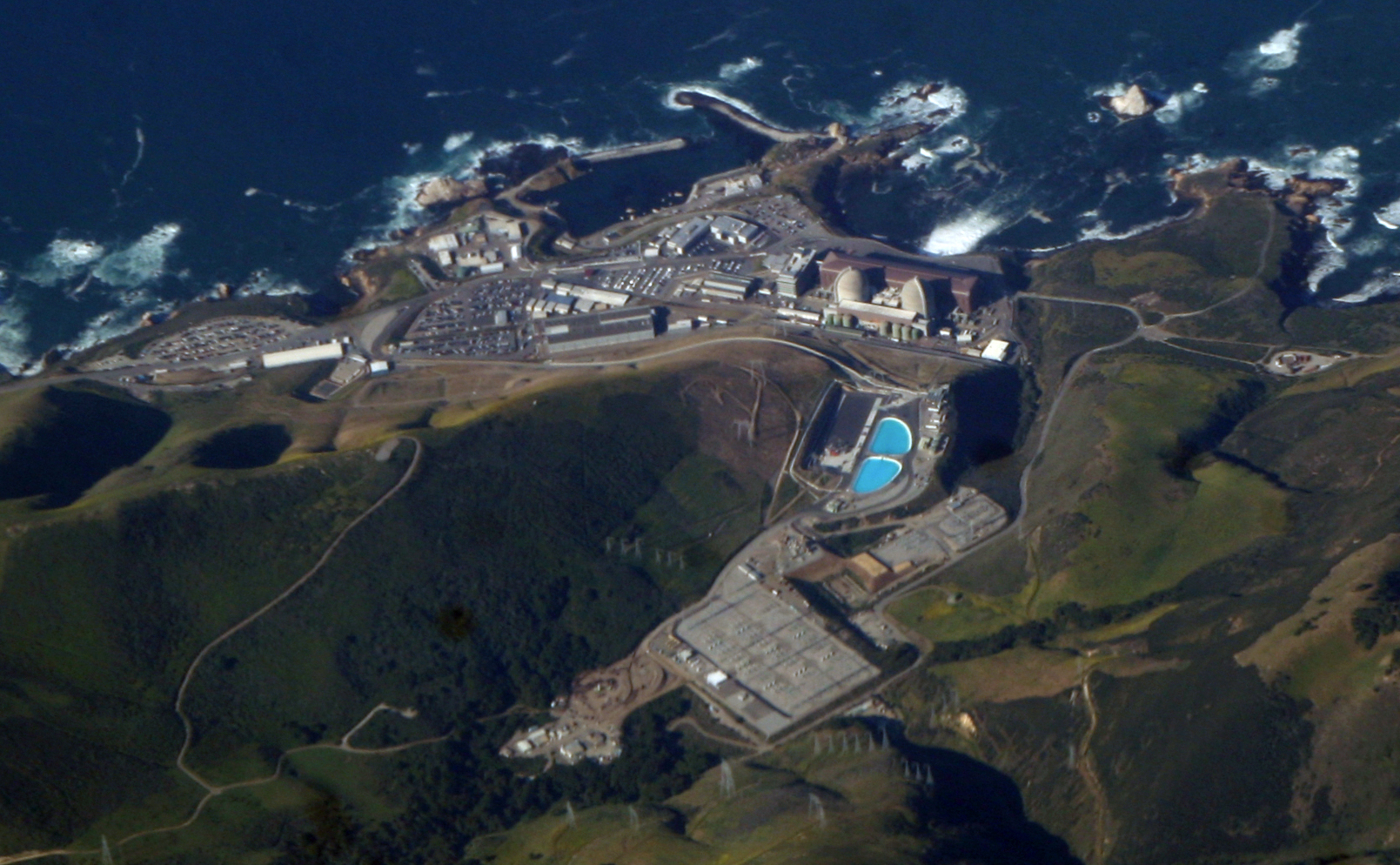
- Diablo Canyon Power Plant
- Country: United States
- Location: San Luis Obispo County, California
- Coordinates: 35°12′39″N 120°51′22″W
- Status: Operational
- Construction began: Unit 1: April 23, 1968; Unit 2: December 9, 1970
- Commission date: Unit 1: May 7, 1985 (41 years ago); Unit 2: March 13, 1986 (40 years ago)
- Decommission date: 2030 (planned)
- Construction cost: $11.556 billion (2007 USD) ($16.8 billion in 2024 dollars)
- Owner: PG&E Corporation
- Operator: Pacific Gas and Electric Company
- Employees: 1,500

Nuclear power station
- Reactor type: PWR
- Reactor supplier: Westinghouse
- Cooling source: Pacific Ocean
- Thermal capacity: 2 × 3411 MW_{th}

Power generation
- Units operational: 1 × 1138 MW; 1 × 1118 MW
- Make and model: WH 4-loop (DRYAMB)
- Nameplate capacity: 2256 MW
- Capacity factor: 88.85% (2025); 87.25% (lifetime)
- Annual net output: 17,558 GWh (2025)

External links
- Website: Diablo Canyon Power Plant
- Commons: Related media on Commons

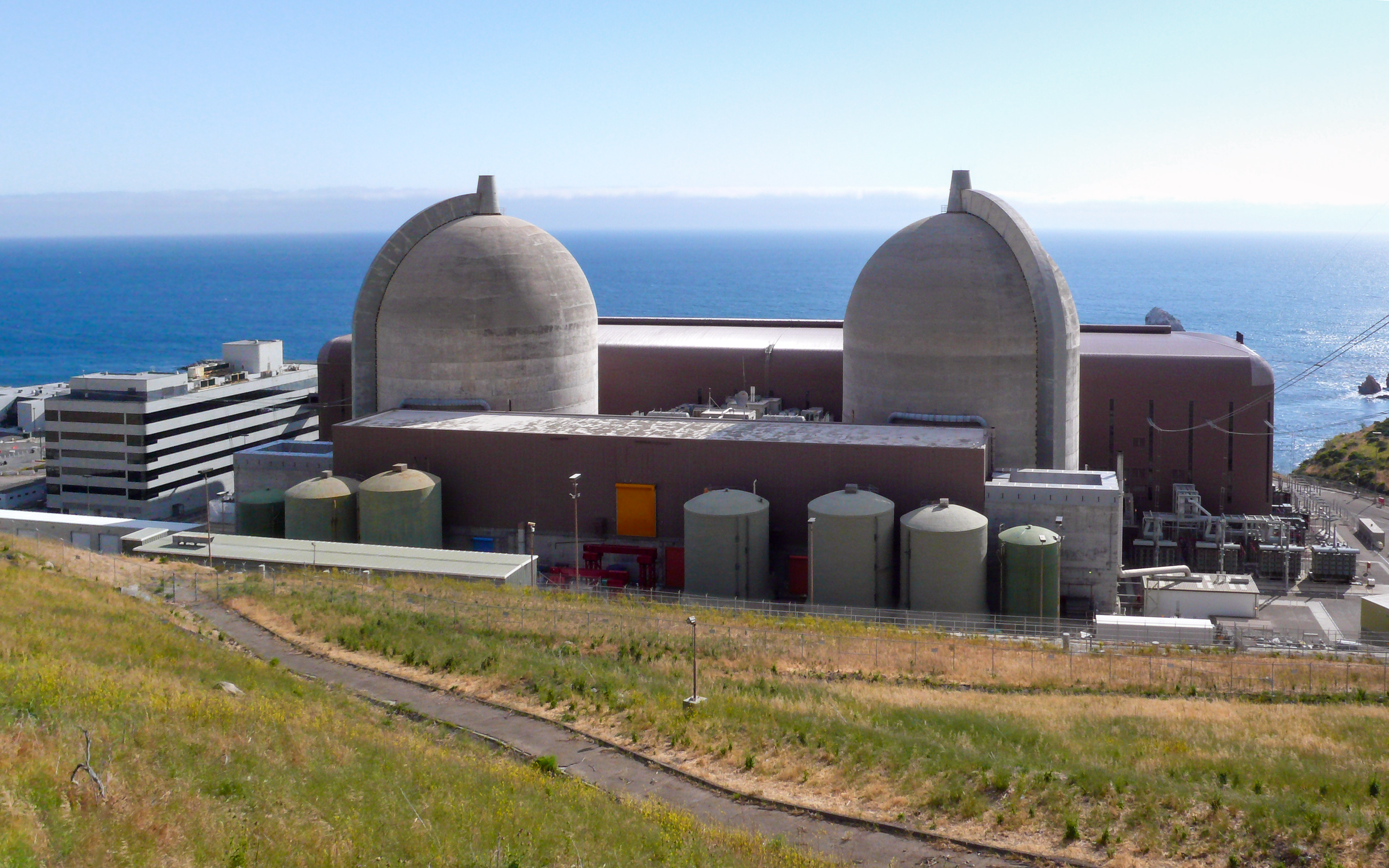
Diablo Canyon Power Plant, 2008. The light beige domes are the containment structures for Unit 1 and 2 reactors. The reddish-brown building is the turbine building where electricity is generated and sent to the grid. To the left is the Administration Building (black and white stripes).

The Diablo Canyon Power Plant is a nuclear power plant near Avila Beach in San Luis Obispo County, California. Following the permanent shutdown of the San Onofre Nuclear Generating Station in 2013, Diablo Canyon is now the only operational nuclear plant in California, as well as the state's largest single power station. It was the subject of controversy and protests during its construction, with nearly two thousand civil disobedience arrests in a two-week period in 1981.

The plant has two Westinghouse-designed 4-loop pressurized water reactors operated by Pacific Gas & Electric (PG&E). Together, the twin 1100 MWe reactors produce about 18,000 GW·h of electricity annually (8.6% of total California generation and 23% of carbon-free generation), supplying the electrical needs of more than 3 million people. For 2026 forward, facility operations and maintenance costs are projected to be $0.03 per kWh generated, but when including new fees authorized by a recent law, that number rises to $0.08 per kWh. Intermittent sources like wind and solar cost $0.05 and $0.06 per kWh without battery storage, but $0.09 and $0.14 with battery storage.

Though it was built less than a mile from the Shoreline Fault line, which was not known to exist at the time of construction, and is located less than three miles (4.8 km) from the Hosgri fault, a 2016 Nuclear Regulatory Commission (NRC) probabilistic risk assessment of the plant, taking into account seismic risk, estimated the frequency of core damage at one instance per 7.6 million reactor years. The plant is located in NRC region IV.

In 2016, PG&E announced plans to close the two Diablo Canyon reactors in 2024 and 2025, stating that because California's energy regulations give renewables priority over nuclear, the plant would likely only run half-time, making it uneconomical. (Note: Nuclear plants are used for base load in order to spread their large fixed costs over as many kWh of generation as possible.) In 2020, experts at the California Independent System Operator (CAISO) warned that when the plant closes the state will reach a "critical inflection point", which will create a significant challenge to ensure reliability of the grid without resorting to more fossil fuel usage, and could jeopardize California's greenhouse gas reduction targets. Further warnings were made by the California Energy Commission and CAISO in 2021 that the state may have summer blackouts in future years as a result of Diablo's closure coinciding with the shutdown of four natural gas plants of 3.7GW total capacity, and the inability to rely on imported electricity during West-wide heat waves due to reduced hydroelectric capacity (from the decades-long drought) and the closure of coal plants. A 2021 report from researchers at MIT and Stanford states that keeping Diablo Canyon running until 2035 would reduce the state's carbon emissions from electricity generation by 11% every year, save the state a cumulative $2.6 billion (rising to $21 billion if kept open until 2045), and improve the reliability of the grid. Full decommissioning of the plant is estimated to take decades and cost nearly $4 billion.

2021-22 Senate Bill 846 (Dodd) extended the plant's operations through 2030.

== Operation ==
Diablo Canyon Power Plant is on approximately 750 acres (300 ha) of land located just west of Avila Beach, California. The power-producing portion of the plant occupies around 12 acres (4.9 ha). PG&E owns a total of 12,820 acres (5,190 ha) of land at the site.

=== Unit One ===
Unit One is a 1138 MWe pressurized water reactor supplied by Westinghouse. It went online on May 7, 1985, and is licensed to operate through November 2, 2024. In 2006, Unit One generated 9,944,983 MW·h of electricity, at a nominal capacity factor of 99.8 percent.

=== Unit Two ===
Unit Two is a 1118 MWe pressurized water reactor supplied by Westinghouse. It went online on March 3, 1986, and is licensed to operate through August 20, 2025. In 2006, Unit Two generated 8,520,000 MW·h of electricity, at a capacity factor of 87.0 percent.

=== Cooling ===
The plant's once-through cooling system (OTC) draws water from the Pacific Ocean to condense steam driving its turbines. Unlike evaporative cooling systems used at other plants, Diablo Canyon's OTC is designed so all water can be recycled, and to assure minimal impact on ocean ecosystems. Reactors can be throttled during heavy storm surges to prevent an excess of kelp from entering the cooling water intake, and power is limited during operation so that water returned to the ocean is no more than 20 °F (11 °C) warmer than ambient temperature.

All thermal power stations in California using OTC systems for cooling employ various filtering capabilities to prevent larvae and other aquatic objects from being drawn into impacts with the grids on the intake tubes, known as entrainment. The Diablo Canyon facility was ranked 13th in estimated power station bio-fouling and egg larvae damage in the state of California in 2013; the less productive fossil gas power units 6 & 7 at Moss Landing Power Plant were ranked as having a far higher impact on fish larvae. In 2014, the California Water Board released a white paper detailing the costs to convert Diablo Canyon to use cooling towers instead of the once-through cooling cycle. These upgrade cost estimates have been the subject of controversy and debate, with some arguing instead for construction of an artificial reef to better offset the environmental impact of diminished larvae spawning.

=== Cost of generated electricity ===
The costs incurred by PG&E at the Diablo Canyon Power Plant include the costs of operating and maintaining the facility, and what the plant's management collects in fees, such as the fixed management fee and the volumetric performance fees, which it passes through to ratepayers.

In 2024, PG&E estimated that their base cost, consisting only of plant maintenance and operations, would have been $43.60 per MWh, but when those fees were included, the unit cost rose to $111.21 per MWh. PG&E representatives told the LA Times that these estimates were caused by temporary factors relating to the decision to extend the plant's operational period, and that from 2026 through to the planned end of operations in 2030, costs were expected to be lower, closer to $75.91 per MWh.

In 2025, PG&E filed projections with California's Public Utility Commission that it would generate 18,203 GWh of electricity during 2026, and it would incur operational costs of $887.1 million, and another $452.3 million in fees, totaling $1.34 billion in costs, for a projected unit cost of $73.58 per MWh.

=== Labor ===
There are approximately 1,200 employees of Pacific Gas & Electric and 200 employees of subcontractors at the Diablo Canyon site. Several unions represent the workforce at Diablo, among them the International Brotherhood of Electrical Workers (IBEW) and the International Association of Machinists. The routine outages for maintenance, and the complex process of refueling, create more than 1,000 temporary jobs, according to PG&E. The staff uses generative AI to find and organize data from the large documentation.

== History ==
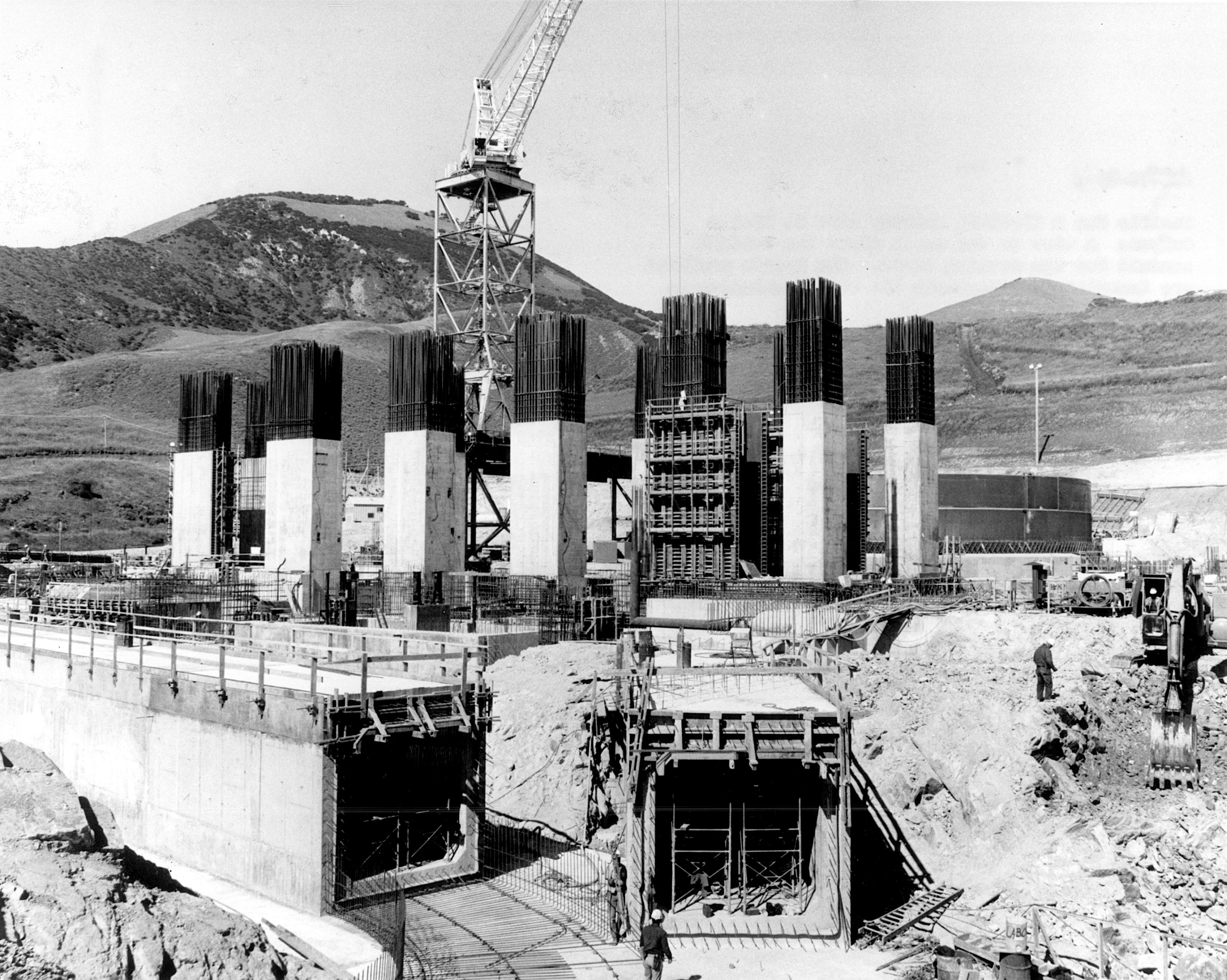
Pacific Gas & Electric Company site at Diablo Canyon: a view to the north shows the outfall conduit for the cooling water. The intake conduits are immediately underneath the worker standing in the middle foreground, circa 1970

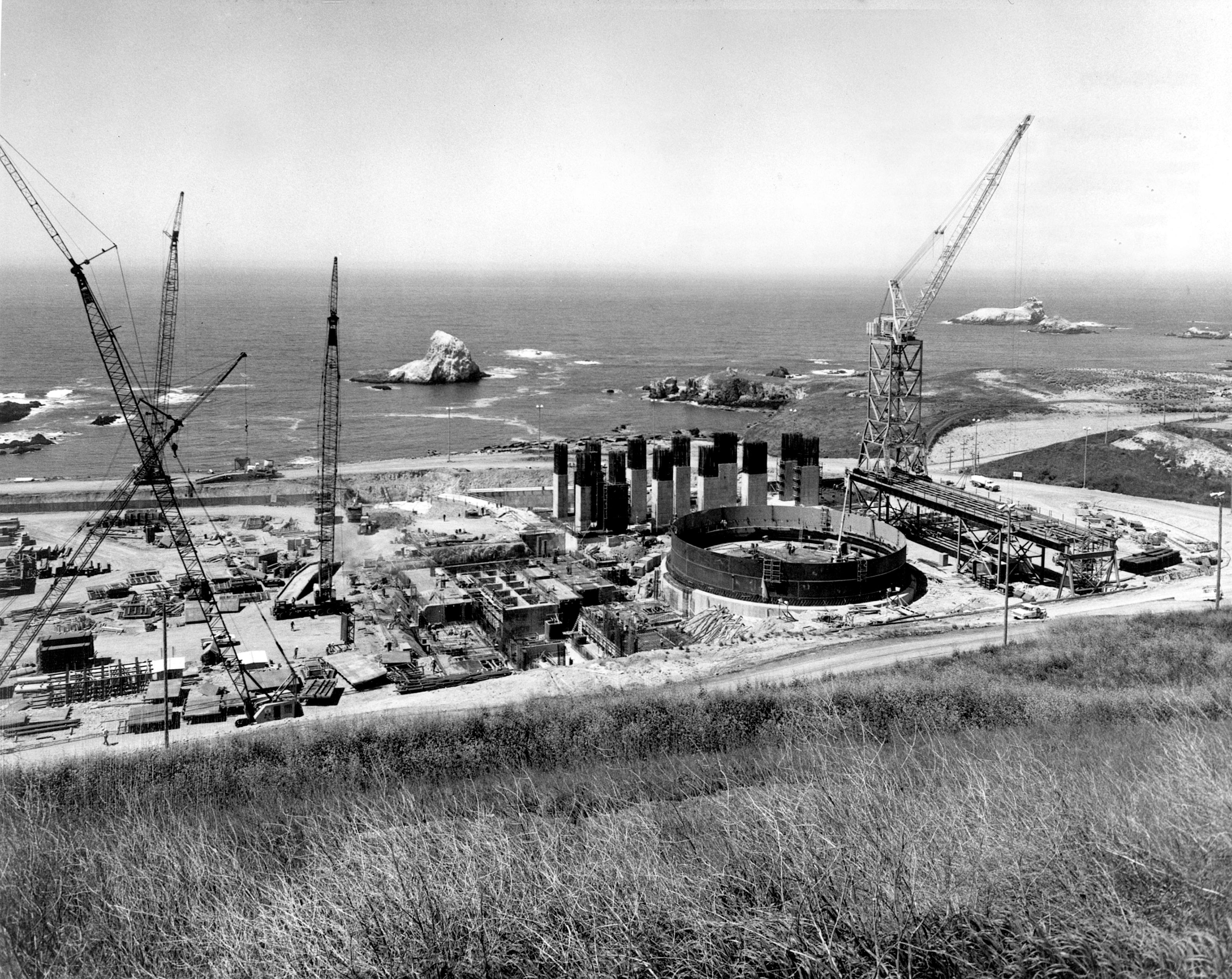
Construction at Diablo Canyon: The circular structure rising in the center of the photograph is the reactor containment, circa 1970

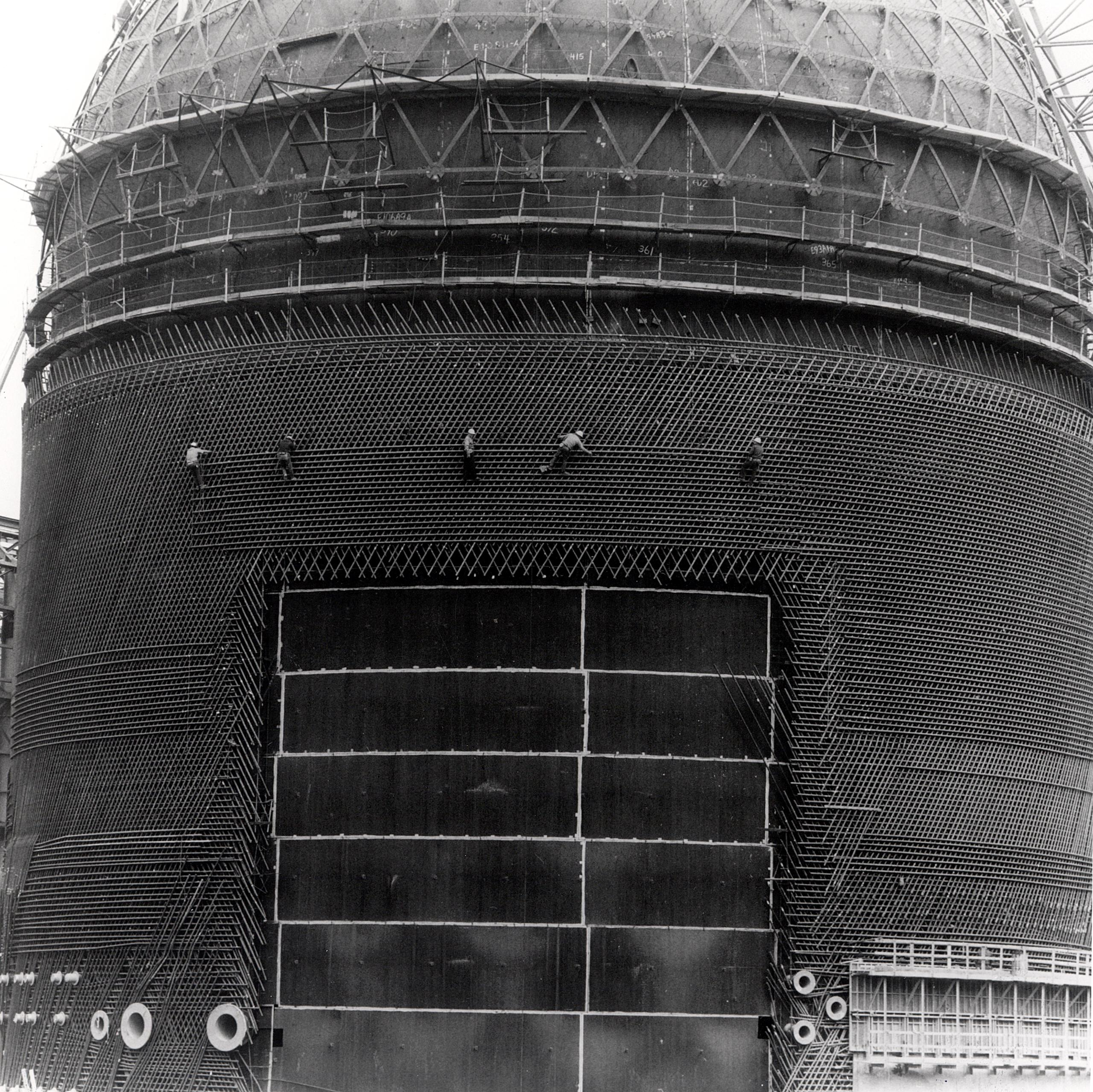
Five steelworkers carefully tie together six layers of 2.25"-diameter reinforcing bars, circa 1972

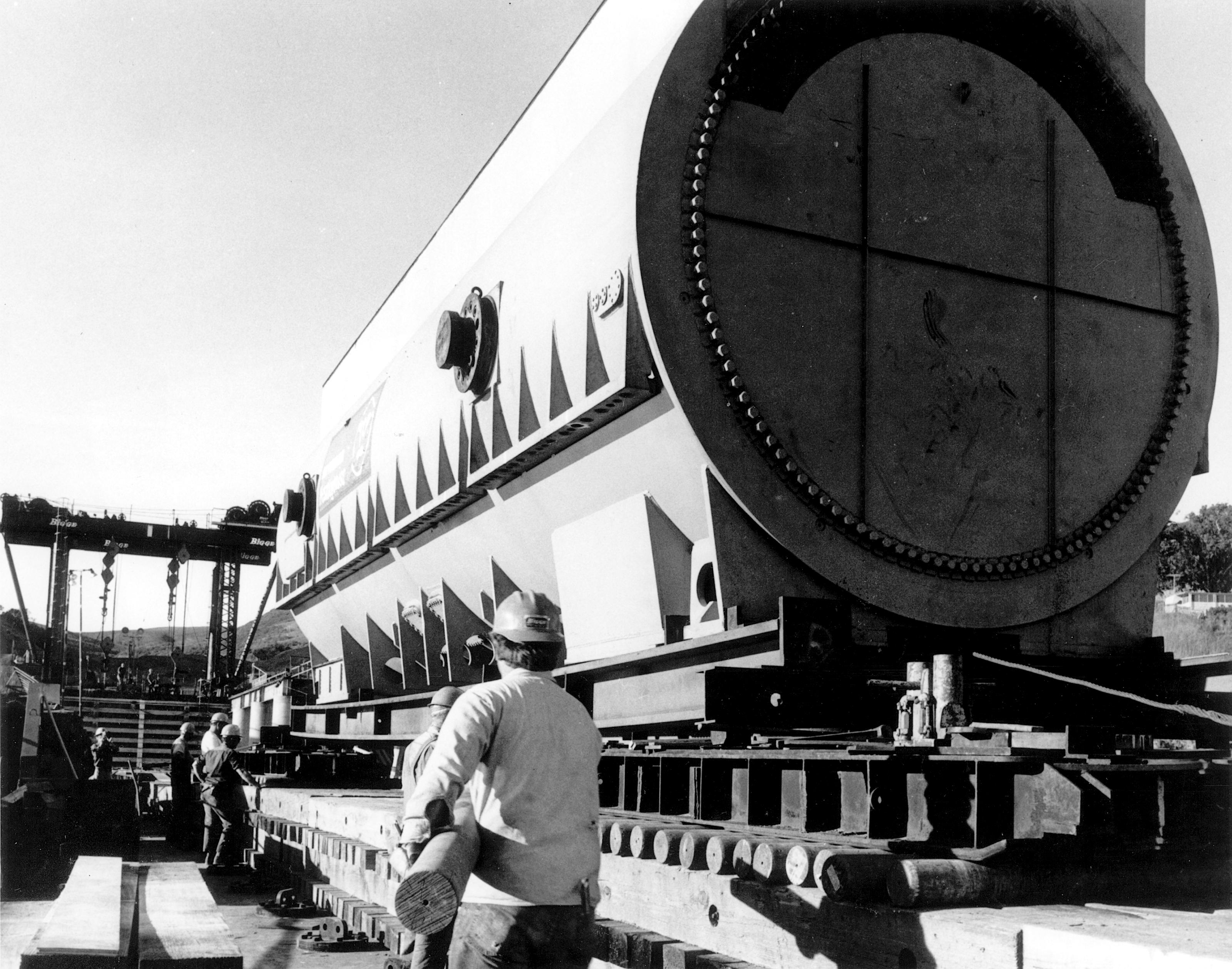
A stator at the plant, circa 1974

Pacific Gas & Electric Company went through six years of hearings, referendums and litigation to have the Diablo Canyon plant approved. A principal concern about the plant is whether it can be sufficiently earthquake-proof; the site was deemed safe when construction began in 1968, but a seismic fault (the Hosgri fault) had been discovered several miles offshore by the time the plant was completed in 1973. This fault experienced a 7.1 magnitude quake 10 miles offshore on November 4, 1927, and thus is capable of generating forces equivalent to approximately 1/16 of those felt in the 1906 San Francisco earthquake.

The company updated its plans and added structural supports designed to reinforce stability in case of earthquake. In September 1981, PG&E discovered that a single set of blueprints was used for these structural supports; workers were supposed to have reversed the plans when switching to the second reactor, but did not. Nonetheless, on March 19, 1982, the Nuclear Regulatory Commission decided not to review its 1978 decision approving the plant's safety, despite these and other design errors.

In response to concern that ground acceleration, or shaking, could cause spillage of submerged fuel rod assemblies which could ignite upon exposure to air, PG&E and NRC regulators insist that the foregoing scenario is anticipated and controlled for, and that there is no basis to anticipate spillage. The launch of additional seismic studies did not delay re-issuance of the operating licenses for the two onsite units.

The Nuclear Regulatory Commission's estimate of the risk each year of an earthquake intense enough to cause core damage to the reactor at Diablo Canyon was 1 in 23,810, according to an NRC study published in August 2010.

In 2009, PG&E applied to the Nuclear Regulatory Commission (NRC) for 20-year license renewals for both reactors.

In April 2011, in the wake of the Fukushima nuclear incident in Japan, PG&E asked the NRC not to issue license renewals until PG&E could complete new seismic studies, which were expected to take at least three years.

On June 24, 2013, at 9:20 PM PDT, Diablo Canyon experienced a loss of offsite power to the startup transformers of both units due to a failure on the 230 kV transmission system. At the time, none of the startup transformers were loaded as both units were online and their electrical systems were at the time being powered by the plant's turbine generators. However, the emergency diesel generators were started with no load during the outage as a precaution in case either unit tripped offline while offsite power was unavailable. The electrical output of the plant via the 500 kV transmission system was not interrupted, allowing both units to remain online during the outage.

=== Public participation and protest ===
Diablo Canyon was built and entered service in the midst of legal challenges and civil disobedience from the anti-nuclear protesters of the Abalone Alliance. Over a two-week period in 1981, 1,900 activists were arrested and sent to jail for protesting at Diablo Canyon Power Plant, including musician/activist Jackson Browne. It was the largest arrest total in the history of the U.S. anti-nuclear movement.

In the spring of 2011, State Senator Sam Blakeslee and US Representative Lois Capps both expressed concern for a renewed safety review. Speaking before the Senate Committee on Environment and Public Works, Representative Capps stated that she believed the "Nuclear Regulatory Commission should stay the license renewal process until the completion of independent, peer reviewed, advanced seismic studies of all faults in the area." The Alliance for Nuclear Responsibility began circulating a petition to similar effect, going further and calling for an outright halt to relicensing. An array of San Luis Obispo-based anti-nuclear groups including Mothers for Peace also called for closure of the plant.

=== Post-Fukushima developments ===
Due to international reactions to the Fukushima Daiichi nuclear disaster, concerns have continued over the ongoing operations of Diablo Canyon which, like the reactors at Fukushima, is in an area prone to earthquakes and tsunami. The elevation of the Fukushima site is approximately 20 feet (6.1 m) above sea level, while Diablo Canyon sits on a bluff 85 feet (26 m) above sea level. According to Victor Dricks, senior public affairs officer for NRC Region IV, the Commission conducted a nationwide review of nuclear power plants for their capacity to respond to earthquakes, power outages and other catastrophic events, and Diablo was found to have "a high level of preparedness and strong capability in terms of equipment and procedures to respond to severe events."

On June 2, 2011, the NRC announced that it would delay the environmental part of the re-licensing application but that it had completed the safety portion. A few days later, the Atomic Safety Licensing Board (ASLB) indicated that it would defer adjustment of the adjudicatory schedule of the four contentions brought by San Luis Obispo Mothers for Peace (SLOMFP), a community-based anti-nuclear organization, accordingly. The ASLB made no findings regarding the merits of the contentions; both PG&E and SLOMFP claimed these developments as victories.

=== Closure extension ===
In January 2016, several authors of An Ecomodernist Manifesto (including Robert Stone, David Keith, Stewart Brand, Michael Shellenberger, Mark Lynas) signed an open letter to California Governor Jerry Brown, Tony Earley, CEO of Pacific Gas & Electric, and California state officials, urging that the plant not be closed. They argued that Diablo is an asset for California in achieving global warming goals since it does not emit greenhouse gases like a natural gas power plant, which are a major contributor to global warming.

S. David Freeman and Damon Moglen from the environmental advocacy group Friends of the Earth, (which was founded in 1969 to oppose Diablo Canyon's construction), commissioned a study to estimate whether it could be cost-effective to replace Diablo with zero-carbon resources. Their study estimated that California will need less grid electricity in the next two decades, and that expected costs to extend Diablo's licenses would be around $17 billion vs. $12–15 billion for replacing it with renewables and energy efficiency. Freeman and Moglen then arranged for a meeting with PG&E's vice president of policy and federal affairs to present her with their report. The group invited Ralph Cavanagh from the Natural Resources Defense Council, as well as other environmental groups. They included the plant's unions in their discussion, who agreed to closing the plant after being offered $350 million for retraining programs and retention bonuses. Lieutenant Governor Gavin Newsom, as a member of the State Lands Commission, was interested in moving the discussion along in part to allow for a slower, greener transition.

On June 21, 2016, PG&E announced a Joint Proposal with Friends of the Earth, the Natural Resources Defense Council, Environment California, the International Brotherhood of Electrical Workers Local 1245, Coalition of California Utility Employees, and Alliance for Nuclear Responsibility to increase investment in energy efficiency, renewables and storage, while phasing out nuclear power.

One reason given by PG&E for the closure is that under California's electricity regulations, renewables are given priority over nuclear and fossil-fuel generation, which would likely have resulted in Diablo only running half-time, and because nuclear plants have large fixed costs, this would essentially double its per-kWh generation costs.

PG&E's CEO stated: "I am sorry to see it go, because from a national energy policy standpoint, we need greenhouse gas-free electricity", Earley said. "But we are regulated by the state of California, and California's policies are driving this."

Specifically, the operating licenses for Diablo Canyon Units 1 and 2 would not be renewed when they expire on November 2, 2024 and August 26, 2025, respectively. PG&E's application to close Diablo Canyon, including the Joint Proposal, was approved by the California Public Utilities Commission in January 2018. In February, PG&E withdrew its application to the Nuclear Regulatory Commission for a licensing extension.

In October 2020, experts at the California Independent System Operator (CAISO) warned that when the plant retires the state will reach a "critical inflection point", which will create a significant challenge to ensure reliability of the grid without resorting to more fossil fuel usage, and could jeopardize California's greenhouse gas reduction targets.

According to David G. Victor, professor of innovation and public policy at UC San Diego: "The politics against nuclear power in California are more powerful and organized than the politics in favor of a climate policy."

A 2021 report from researchers at MIT and Stanford University states that keeping Diablo Canyon running until 2035 would reduce the state's carbon emissions from electricity generation by 11% every year, save the state a cumulative $2.6 billion, and improve the reliability of the grid. They state that three factors have changed since the 2018 decision to close the plant: the state passed a new law (sb100) which requires 100% emissions-free electricity generation by 2045, the whole western US region is in a continuing mega-drought (limiting hydroelectric generation), and demand for electricity has outpaced supply, especially during heatwaves. They also stated that keeping Diablo operating until 2045 would save the state a cumulative $21 billion.

Steven Chu, energy secretary in the Obama administration, endorsed the study and said: "We are not in a position in the near-term future to go to 100% renewable energy, and there will be times when the wind doesn't blow, the sun doesn't shine and we will need some power that we can turn on and dispatch at will, and that leaves two choices: fossil fuel or nuclear" and he noted that countries that have shut down their nuclear plants have ended up using more fossil fuels. He also called the decision to shutdown the plant "distressing" and said "Nuclear power is something we should reconsider, and we should ask PG&E to reconsider."

Some of the continued generation from the plant could be used for relieving the drought-caused water shortages by powering a desalination plant (costing half as much as the Carlsbad desalination plant for the same capacity), or to generate hydrogen as a carbon-free fuel for manufacturing and transportation uses, at half the cost of producing it with wind or solar power, with a smaller land footprint.

In October 2021 the California Energy Commission and CAISO stated that the state may have summer blackouts in future years as a result of Diablo's closure coinciding with the shutdown of four natural gas plants of 3.7GW total capacity, and the inability to rely on imported electricity during West-wide heat waves. (The reduction of importable electricity is due to both the decades-long drought reducing hydroelectric capacity, and the closing of coal plants.)

In a November 2021 opinion article, the editorial board of The Washington Post said: "If the state is serious about achieving carbon neutrality over the next few decades—and it should be—it cannot start by shutting down a source of emissions-free energy that accounts for nearly 10 percent of its in-state electricity production. A new report from experts at the Massachusetts Institute of Technology and Stanford University has made that point clearly: Closing down Diablo Canyon would be the definition of climate incoherence." and "The report finds that without Diablo Canyon, the state's electricity shortage would have been three times as severe during [2020]'s massive blackouts." and "Closing Diablo Canyon would make the state's energy transition costlier, longer and more chaotic."

In February 2022 a group of 79 scientists published an open letter highlighting that the plant provides 18 TWh of low-carbon electricity annually and its closure is at odds with decarbonization goals.

In response to these concerns, in August 2022 California Governor Gavin Newsom proposed providing PG&E with a $1.4 billion loan to support the continued operation of Diablo Canyon for another 5 to 10 years. The California Legislature approved the loan on September 1 with the passage of Senate Bill 846. The bill also charged the California Public Utilities Commission with monitoring cost increases that might make the plant uneconomical to operate and to close the plant if its operations "prove to be economically disadvantageous, or even financially catastrophic, for California electricity consumers". PG&E is also expected to seek funding from a $6 billion federal program intended to support the continued operation of nuclear plants facing closure. PG&E asked the NRC in October 2022 to resume consideration of a license renewal application initially submitted in 2009. Regulatory approvals will also be needed from the U.S. Department of Energy, California State Lands Commission, California Energy Commission, California Coastal Commission, and California Public Utilities Commission.

The Department of Energy approved $1.1 billion in funding in November 2022 from the Civil Nuclear Credit program which was included in the Infrastructure Investment and Jobs Act.

== Safety ==
=== Earthquake protection ===
Diablo Canyon was originally designed to withstand a 6.75 magnitude earthquake from four faults, including the nearby San Andreas Fault and Hosgri Fault, but was later upgraded to withstand a 7.5 magnitude quake. It has redundant seismic monitoring and a safety system designed to shut it down promptly in the event of significant ground motion.

=== Independent Safety Committee ===
The Diablo Canyon Independent Safety Committee (DCISC) was established as a part of a settlement agreement entered into in June 1988 between the Division of Ratepayer Advocates of the California Public Utilities Commission (CPUC), the Attorney General for the State of California, and Pacific Gas and Electric Company (PG&E). It consists of three members, one each appointed by the Governor, the Attorney General and the Chairperson of the California Energy Commission. They serve staggered three-year terms. The committee has no authority to direct PG&E personnel.

=== Emergency planning ===
The Nuclear Regulatory Commission defines two emergency planning zones around nuclear power plants: a plume exposure pathway zone with a radius of 10 miles (16 km), concerned primarily with exposure to, and inhalation of, airborne radioactive contamination, and an ingestion pathway zone of about 50 miles (80 km), concerned primarily with ingestion of food and liquid contaminated by radioactivity.

The 2010 U.S. population within 10 miles (16 km) of Diablo Canyon was 26,123, an increase of 50.2% in a decade, according to an analysis of U.S. Census data for msnbc.com. The 2010 U.S. population within 50 miles (80 km) was 465,521, an increase of 22.4% since 2000. Cities within 50 miles include San Luis Obispo (12 miles to city center) and Paso Robles (31 miles to city center).

Emergency sirens were installed when the plant initially went operational. Federal law requires an early warning system that radiates out 10 miles from any nuclear facility. The county siren coverage goes farther, extending from Cayucos in the north to upper Nipomo to the south. All businesses are required to have a siren information sticker in their business generally located within the restrooms. Schools, government offices, and any other public building will have a PAZ card (Protective Action Zone). These cards show the 12 zones of evacuation with zone one being the plant itself. The cards also show the direction of evacuation on the highways.

== Electricity production ==
Generation (MWh) of Diablo Canyon Power Plant
| Year | Jan | Feb | Mar | Apr | May | Jun | Jul | Aug | Sep | Oct | Nov | Dec | Annual (Total) |
|---|---|---|---|---|---|---|---|---|---|---|---|---|---|
| 2001 | 1,525,244 | 1,485,080 | 1,641,948 | 1,521,122 | 849,893 | 1,551,157 | 1,641,614 | 1,640,733 | 1,562,472 | 1,583,472 | 1,457,320 | 1,617,658 | 18,077,713 |
| 2002 | 1,571,813 | 1,400,306 | 1,640,898 | 1,506,506 | 837,835 | 1,436,401 | 1,602,027 | 1,545,177 | 1,558,103 | 1,296,739 | 687,427 | 1,220,974 | 16,304,206 |
| 2003 | 1,631,359 | 793,221 | 841,539 | 1,187,258 | 1,644,785 | 1,530,373 | 1,639,201 | 1,643,064 | 1,585,538 | 1,638,662 | 1,583,856 | 1,566,183 | 17,285,039 |
| 2004 | 1,603,460 | 1,440,359 | 1,277,888 | 783,061 | 796,125 | 1,212,488 | 1,547,670 | 1,624,119 | 1,552,821 | 1,436,340 | 792,634 | 1,163,472 | 15,230,437 |
| 2005 | 1,613,306 | 1,405,477 | 1,634,241 | 1,579,485 | 1,631,023 | 1,563,650 | 1,635,820 | 1,632,265 | 1,446,022 | 1,358,644 | 776,329 | 1,479,040 | 17,755,302 |
| 2006 | 1,648,808 | 1,497,112 | 1,658,752 | 1,229,920 | 932,000 | 1,637,676 | 1,695,432 | 1,686,784 | 1,635,172 | 1,685,593 | 1,575,764 | 1,507,982 | 18,390,995 |
| 2007 | 1,693,248 | 1,525,089 | 1,690,619 | 1,554,389 | 852,197 | 1,627,930 | 1,688,585 | 1,454,699 | 1,631,781 | 1,683,859 | 1,614,813 | 1,571,281 | 18,588,490 |
| 2008 | 1,656,514 | 829,903 | 840,213 | 1,261,141 | 1,638,605 | 1,632,295 | 1,682,212 | 1,259,242 | 1,449,057 | 1,552,863 | 1,616,118 | 1,672,364 | 17,090,527 |
| 2009 | 1,488,879 | 751,745 | 950,830 | 1,634,919 | 1,614,195 | 1,621,198 | 1,608,408 | 1,336,564 | 1,365,692 | 888,647 | 1,315,998 | 1,687,783 | 16,264,858 |
| 2010 | 1,559,639 | 1,467,335 | 1,696,220 | 1,642,753 | 1,699,737 | 1,645,987 | 1,696,146 | 1,696,174 | 1,636,026 | 847,393 | 1,180,980 | 1,661,535 | 18,429,925 |
| 2011 | 1,692,964 | 1,528,441 | 1,542,395 | 1,609,954 | 844,430 | 1,456,556 | 1,690,001 | 1,682,731 | 1,525,243 | 1,671,988 | 1,634,559 | 1,686,812 | 18,566,074 |
| 2012 | 1,688,081 | 1,515,618 | 1,695,061 | 1,204,192 | 841,181 | 1,115,654 | 1,693,320 | 1,692,593 | 1,621,859 | 1,545,477 | 1,557,988 | 1,541,444 | 17,712,468 |
| 2013 | 1,690,733 | 810,923 | 1,014,766 | 1,641,779 | 1,692,223 | 1,498,929 | 1,485,846 | 1,688,180 | 1,634,281 | 1,581,357 | 1,595,494 | 1,677,928 | 18,012,439 |
| 2014 | 1,597,319 | 799,061 | 960,097 | 1,644,750 | 1,679,904 | 1,627,661 | 1,663,326 | 1,508,498 | 1,611,914 | 940,932 | 1,422,921 | 1,529,595 | 16,985,978 |
| 2015 | 1,563,700 | 1,526,210 | 1,694,001 | 1,645,487 | 1,696,424 | 1,639,554 | 1,681,722 | 1,666,228 | 1,533,642 | 904,616 | 1,370,238 | 1,583,563 | 18,505,385 |
| 2016 | 1,690,198 | 1,582,510 | 1,694,947 | 1,635,303 | 846,524 | 1,526,133 | 1,695,468 | 1,685,863 | 1,630,606 | 1,604,631 | 1,622,046 | 1,693,349 | 18,907,578 |
| 2017 | 1,645,132 | 1,526,365 | 1,569,141 | 1,412,868 | 840,135 | 959,831 | 1,648,012 | 1,682,881 | 1,623,061 | 1,683,557 | 1,628,939 | 1,681,157 | 17,901,079 |
| 2018 | 1,666,162 | 982,658 | 1,046,927 | 1,546,437 | 1,682,785 | 1,637,307 | 1,686,430 | 1,620,869 | 1,614,534 | 1,667,833 | 1,573,910 | 1,487,667 | 18,213,519 |
| 2019 | 1,681,619 | 987,002 | 1,132,805 | 1,551,843 | 1,692,739 | 1,632,855 | 1,687,150 | 1,677,931 | 1,369,770 | 839,895 | 800,964 | 1,110,811 | 16,165,384 |
| 2020 | 1,689,545 | 1,486,059 | 1,671,026 | 1,630,645 | 1,597,652 | 1,628,068 | 1,278,695 | 1,597,801 | 1,599,991 | 438,597 | 784,013 | 856,606 | 16,258,698 |
| 2021 | 1,287,253 | 799,811 | 841,163 | 922,229 | 1,674,327 | 1,633,953 | 1,683,581 | 1,681,490 | 1,626,712 | 1,197,610 | 1,445,614 | 1,683,623 | 16,477,366 |
| 2022 | 1,656,360 | 1,481,389 | 1,466,126 | 864,541 | 1,692,998 | 1,633,288 | 1,684,102 | 1,679,400 | 1,611,663 | 1,223,462 | 929,459 | 1,670,466 | 17,593,254 |
| 2023 | 1,603,068 | 1,519,676 | 1,540,951 | 1,636,919 | 1,681,901 | 1,624,861 | 1,678,408 | 1,657,704 | 1,550,608 | 775,964 | 1,069,182 | 1,379,126 | 17,718,368 |
| 2024 | 1,680,738 | 1,571,077 | 1,681,332 | 973,530 | 1,039,471 | 1,633,639 | 1,683,852 | 1,652,452 | 1,517,681 | 1,631,288 | 1,632,208 | 1,681,567 | 18,378,835 |
| 2025 | 1,686,340 | 1,523,028 | 1,583,593 | 1,141,022 | 1,150,741 | 1,637,668 | 1,660,799 | 1,505,966 | 1,625,613 | 946,987 | 1,480,818 | 1,615,819 | 17,558,394 |
| 2026 | 1,679,612 | 1,468,180 | 1,569,155 | 1,635,460 | 1,556,602 | 1,631,779 | 1,577,497 | 1,672,245 | | | | | -- |

== See also ==
- Critical Masses: Opposition to Nuclear Power in California, 1958–1978 ISBN 0299158543
- Dark Circle (film)
- Economics of nuclear power plants
- John Gofman
- Nuclear policy in the United States
- Largest nuclear power plants in the United States
