= Public Advocates Office =

California consumer advocacy arm of the California Public Utilities Commission

- Abbreviation: Cal Advocates
- Formation: 1984; 42 years ago
- Type: State entity
- Purpose: Ensure Californians are represented at the California Public Utilities Commission and in other forums
- Location: San Francisco, California, United States
- Region served: California
- Key people: Linda Serizawa (Director)
- Website: publicadvocates.cpuc.ca.gov
- Formerly called: Office of Ratepayer Advocates (ORA)

The Public Advocates Office (Cal Advocates), formerly Office of Ratepayer Advocates, is the consumer-advocacy arm of the California Public Utilities Commission (CPUC), which regulates privately owned public utilities in the state of California.

Cal Advocates is a statutorily mandated agency that is specifically authorized to represent the interests of public utility customers within the jurisdiction of the CPUC to obtain the lowest possible rate for service consistent with reliable and safe service levels. In fulfilling its mission, Cal Advocates also advocates for customer and environmental protections.

== History ==
Cal Advocates was created by the CPUC as a separate “Public Staff Division” in 1984 under the name Office of Ratepayer Advocates (ORA). Prior to the creation of Cal Advocates, the CPUC staff often functioned as both advocates in formal regulatory proceedings as well as in an advisory role to the Commission. Over time, this dual role of staff as both advocates and advisors came under criticism from both utilities and consumer organizations.

The California Legislature codified the Public Staff Division in Public Utilities Code Section 309.5, renaming it - at various times in its history - the Division of Ratepayer Advocates and the Office of Ratepayer Advocates (see SB 608 (2005), and SB 96 (2013)). In 2018, the legislature changed the office's name from the Office of Ratepayer Advocates to the Public Advocate's Office (AB 1820 & SB 854).

In 1996, SB 960 recognized the importance of keeping the office housed within the CPUC to preserve the efficiency of mutual operations, but also granted it a measure of independence with respect to policy, advocacy and budget. SB 960 also made the Director a gubernatorial appointee subject to Senate confirmation. SB 201 further expanded the office's role to represent consumer interest outside the formal administrative proceedings of the CPUC.

In 2005, the Legislature further defined and codified the role of Cal Advocates with SB 608, providing the agency the autonomy over its budget and staffing resources and authorizing the appointment of a full-time Chief Counsel.

Cal Advocates is a member of the National Association of State Utility Consumer Advocates (NASUCA), which includes 44 utility consumer advocates in 40 states designated by law to represent the interests of consumers in their jurisdictions before state and federal regulators.

== Role ==
Unlike other consumer advocates who intervene in CPUC proceedings, Cal Advocates has a mandate by law to represent the interests of ratepayers in virtually all Commission proceedings. In 2010, Cal Advocates participated in more than 200 proceedings and filed more than 660 pleadings. According to the office's 2022 Annual Report, Cal Advocates participated in nearly 254 proceedings and filed around 754 pleadings. In certain proceedings, such as water utility rate cases, it is usually the only party representing the interests of customers. Similarly, in more obscure energy cases, Cal Advocates is often the sole voice for consumer interests

=== Energy ===
Cal Advocates represents the ratepayers of California’s investor-owned energy utilities, or approximately 80% of all California’s energy customers. In 2011, the office advocacy efforts saved ratepayers $4 billion in energy costs.

Cal Advocates also acts as a consumer advocate in the state’s policymaking to reduce greenhouse gases, increase energy efficiency, keep the energy system reliable, and increase renewable energy in ways that do not unnecessarily burden the ratepayers, especially those who face low-income.

=== Water ===
Cal Advocates represents 1.3 million customers of investor-owned Class A & B water utilities. Cal Advocates scrutinizes water utility requests for additional revenues that will increase customer bills and intervenes to shape water policies to protect ratepayer interests while meeting the state’s water conservation goals. In 2011, it saved water customer over $23.3 million.

Cal Advocates has advocated for cost-effective water conservation and encouraged associated energy savings measures. The office seeks water supply solutions to address long-term water supply needs while keeping rates affordable.

=== Communications ===
Cal Advocates represents customers of both wireline and wireless telephone carriers on Communications policy issues with particular focus on affordability, consumer protection, and service quality. It also works to ensure that all customers have equal access to broadband services at reasonable costs. In 2011, Cal Advocates succeeded in convincing the CPUC to examine the existence of viable competition in the largely rate-deregulated telecommunications industry.

Cal Advocates persuaded the CPUC to take action to address basic telephone service “LifeLine” rates targeted to California’s low-income population, which were expected to increase in January 2011 in the absence of CPUC action. Subsequently, the CPUC capped LifeLine rates to $6.84 for the next two years. The CPUC also adopted Cal Advocates’s recommendation to offer LifeLine customers a wireless option.

Cal Advocates won additional protections for wireless telephone customers as the CPUC adopted rules in 2010 requiring phone companies to be responsible for the content of their bills, refund customers for unauthorized charges, and provide customers with the option to block third party charges to their phone bills.

== Structure ==
The current staffing level consists of 142 technical, policy, and financial analysts with professional backgrounds as engineers, auditors, and economists with expertise in regulatory issues related to the electricity, [natural gas], telecommunications, and water industries in California.
