= San Gregorio Fault =

Fault zone in California, USA

Coordinates: 35°07′N 119°39′W

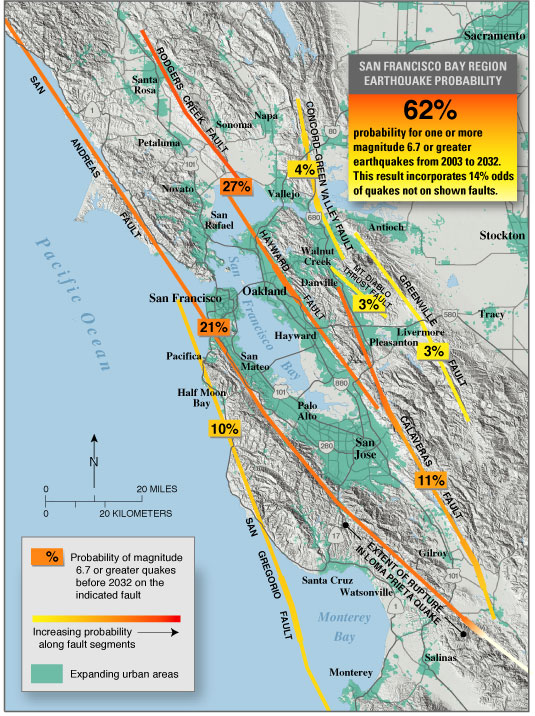
U.S. Geological Survey map showing the trace of the San Gregorio Fault in yellow, lower center.

The San Gregorio Fault is an active, 209 km (130 mi) long fault located off the coast of Northern California. The northern end is about 20 km northwest of San Francisco, near Bolinas Bay, where the San Gregorio intersects the San Andreas Fault, and the fault continues southward past Big Sur as the Hosgri Fault (also Hosgri Fault Zone, San Gregorio-Hosgri Fault Zone) as an offshore fault zone located near the Central Coast of California in San Luis Obispo County. Most of the San Gregorio fault trace is located offshore beneath the waters of Monterey Bay, Half Moon Bay, and the Pacific Ocean, though it cuts across land near Point Año Nuevo and Pillar Point. The San Gregorio Fault is part of a system of coastal faults which run roughly parallel to the San Andreas.

The movement of the San Gregorio is right-lateral strike-slip, and the slip rate is estimated to be 4–10 mm/year (0.2–0.4 inch/year). The most recent major earthquake along the fault had an estimated magnitude of 7 to 7.25 and occurred after 1270 AD—the earliest calibrated radiocarbon date for a native Californian cooking hearth at the Seal Cove site near Moss Beach that shows signs of displacement—but before 1775, when Spanish missionaries arrived in northern California and recorded history began for the region.

Portions of the fault that come ashore near the cliffs between Pillar Point and Moss Beach are sometimes referred to as "Seal Cove Fault" in the geological literature.

== Hosgri Fault ==
The main fault stretches for about 87 miles (140 km), and is located nearest to the coastal communities of Cambria, San Simeon, Morro Bay, Baywood Park-Los Osos and Avila Beach. The fault system (including its branches) is some 260 mi (420 km) long, and is a right-lateral strand of the San Andreas Fault system.

Its movement is primarily reverse thrust, as well as exhibiting right lateral slip, and is thought to be capable of generating earthquakes of up to magnitude 7.5. The November 4, 1927 Lompoc earthquake (magnitude 7.1) is thought to have occurred (uncertainty) on this fault.

=== Diablo Canyon Power Plant ===
Seismologists monitor activity on the Hosgri fault constantly because of its physical proximity to the nuclear Diablo Canyon Power Plant. In fact, the fault lies only 2 1/2 miles offshore from the nuclear power plant. More recently in 2008, yet another even closer fault was discovered, the Shoreline Fault 1 mile from the NPP.
