= Thomas Wellock =

American historian (born 1959)

- Born: 1959 (age 66–67)
- Citizenship: American
- Education: University of Bridgeport (BS); University of Toledo (MA); University of California, Berkeley (PhD)
- Occupation: Historian

Thomas Raymond Wellock (born 1959) is an American historian who served as the U.S. Nuclear Regulatory Commission's official historian from 2010–2025. Trained as both an engineer and a historian, he writes scholarly histories of the regulation of commercial nuclear energy. His most recent book as of 2026 is Safe Enough? A History of Nuclear Power and Accident Risk with the University of California Press in 2021. A review in the New Yorker called Safe Enough? a "refreshingly candid account of how the government...approached the bottom-line question posed by the book's title."

Until 2010 he was a Professor in the Department of History at Central Washington University, in Ellensburg, Washington. In 2007 he received the "CWU Phi Kappa Phi Scholar of the Year" Award. His teaching and research interests include environmental history, western history, recent US history, and political history. He received his Ph.D. in History from the University of California, Berkeley, in 1995, with a dissertation published as Critical Masses: Opposition to Nuclear Power in California, 1958-1978 by the University of Wisconsin Press. His MA in history is from the University of Toledo; his B.S. in mechanical engineering is from the University of Bridgeport.

In 2007, Wellock also published Preserving the Nation: The Conservation and Environmental Movements, 1870-2000.

In 2010, he succeeded J. Samuel Walker as the NRC's official historian. In 2024, Wellock was awarded the NRC's Meritorious Service Award, in recognition of, "his outstanding achievements in educating members of the Commission, the staff, and the public on nuclear regulatory history."

He retired from the NRC in early 2025.
