= Theodore F. Craver Jr. =

American business executive

- Education: University of Southern California
- Occupation: Business executive
- Known for: Chairman, President and Chief Executive Officer of Edison International

Theodore F. Craver Jr. is an American business executive. He is the retired chairman, president and chief executive officer (2008–2016) of Edison International, a public utility holding company listed on the New York Stock Exchange with $13 billion in revenues and $57 billion in assets.

== Education ==
Craver graduated from the University of Southern California, where he received a Bachelor of Arts degree in economics and international relations (1974) and a Master of Business Administration (1977).

== Career ==
=== Financial services industry (1973–1996) ===
- Craver worked for Security Pacific National Bank from 1973 to 1980 in the International Studies Section of the Economics Department, and later in the Foreign Exchange Department.
- He worked for Bankers Trust Company from 1980 to 1984 in various capital markets sales and trading roles in the Los Angeles, New York and Hong Kong offices.
- Craver worked for First Interstate Bancorp from 1984 to 1996. He was executive vice president (EVP) and chief financial officer of the wholesale banking subsidiary (1986–1991) and EVP and corporate treasurer at the parent company (1991–1996). As corporate treasurer, he was responsible for treasury and funding functions of the 13 subsidiary banks, asset and liability management, investment management of $10 billion bank portfolio and $300 million venture capital portfolio, bank broker dealer, and mergers and acquisitions.

=== Energy and utilities (1996–2016) ===
Craver joined Edison International in 1996 as Treasurer of Edison International and Southern California Edison. He became the chief executive officer of Edison Enterprises in 1999, charged with the restructuring of Edison's competitive retail electric business. He served as Chief Financial Officer of Edison International from 2000 to 2004. From 2005 to 2007, he was chief executive officer of Edison Mission Group, Edison International's independent power producer.

Craver was elected a director of Edison International in October 2007, president in April 2008, and chairman and chief executive officer in August 2008. He retired as chairman and CEO in September 2016. Accomplishments during his tenure as CEO included moving Edison's shares from an industry median position to the top quartile in 5-year total shareholder return; doubling annual capital investment in electric infrastructure, which resulted in doubling the rate base and earnings per share of the regulated utility; and increasing dividends by 57%. He repositioned Edison International's business portfolio: the company exited the independent power generation business, and he repositioned the regulated utility, Southern California Edison, to deemphasize investment in electric generation and focus investment on the transmission and distribution of electricity and modernizing the grid. He initiated an Operational Excellence program to improve customer experience, improve quality and efficiency of operations, and reduce costs and customer rates.

In 2009, Craver successfully negotiated for a solar energy contract for Edison to install solar panels on unused commercial rooftops across Southern California. The contract also allows the company to solicit other solar-power companies to install solar panels and sell the power back to Edison. Craver suggested this would strengthen the electrical grid in Southern California and create jobs.

During his term as Edison CEO, Craver was on the board of directors of the Electric Power Research Institute, the Institute of Nuclear Power Operations, the Edison Electric Institute and the Electric Drive Transportation Association. He also was chairman of the Electric Power Research Institute (2011–2012) and of the Edison Electric Institute (2014–2015).

== Awards ==
- Electric Light & Power, Large Utility CEO of the Year (2014)
- Edison Electric Institute, Distinguished Leadership Award (2016)
- Boy Scouts of America: Americanism Award, Distinguished Eagle Scout Award (2016)

== Personal life ==
Craver resides with his wife in Los Angeles, California. He is an Eagle Scout (1967).
