= Alliance for Nuclear Responsibility =

Alliance for Nuclear Responsibility is a non-profit, anti-nuclear, public interest organization founded in 2005, and based in San Luis Obispo, California. It is focused on public citizen activism and public participation with regard to the Diablo Canyon Power Plant, also known as the Diablo Canyon Nuclear Power Plant. The focus of the group is primarily on using leverage at the level of state agencies such as the California Public Utilities Commission. Concurrent jurisdiction of their concern also includes the California Coastal Commission, which certifies compliance of all action within the coastal zone which thus includes the plant. Their posture is primarily oppositional. Other venues for activism include the Nuclear Regulatory Commission, California Energy Commission, Regional Water Quality Control Board, SLO County, the California legislature, the office of the state attorney general, and the US Congress, of which they are in the 23rd District.

David Weisman is also active with the Alliance, and recently has interviewed widely with respect to the Fukushima aftermath. Mr. Weisman asserts that the Alliance is pro-labor and in support of jobs, and that nuclear power is not economical. The Alliance distinguishes itself in this regard from organizations such as the Sierra Club, which are primarily focused on the environmental impacts of nuclear power. He recently appeared at a Nuclear Regulatory Commission presentations, in the San Luis Obispo and Santa Barbara counties on June 15 and 16th, respectively.

== See also ==
- Abalone Alliance
- Diablo Canyon Power Plant
- Mothers for Peace
- Diablo Canyon earthquake vulnerability
