= S. David Freeman =

American businessman and engineer (1926–2020)

- Born: Simon David Freeman; January 14, 1926; Chattanooga, Tennessee, US
- Died: May 12, 2020 (aged 94); Reston, Virginia, US
- Education: Georgia Tech (BS); University of Tennessee (JD)

Simon David Freeman (January 14, 1926 – May 12, 2020) was an American engineer, attorney, and author, who had many key roles in energy policy. After working with the Tennessee Valley Authority, first as an engineer and later as an attorney, he was selected to sit on energy committees by Lyndon Johnson in 1967. He then worked with the United States Environmental Protection Agency, before returning to the TVA as chairman at the request of Jimmy Carter. After finishing his term, Freeman headed several public utilities companies, most notably the New York Power Authority, the Sacramento Municipal Utility District and the Los Angeles Department of Water and Power.

== Early life and education ==
Freeman was born on January 14, 1926, in Chattanooga, Tennessee, the son of Lena and Morris Freeman, an umbrella repairman. His parents were Lithuanian Jewish and Russian Jewish immigrants to the United States via Ellis Island. Freeman received a degree in electrical engineering from Georgia Tech in 1948. After working for five years with the Tennessee Valley Authority (TVA), he went on to study law at the University of Tennessee, earning a Juris Doctor in 1956. He subsequently went back to work for the TVA, this time as an attorney.

== Career ==
Freeman was appointed to energy committees by President Lyndon Johnson in 1967 and worked in the Environmental Protection Agency (EPA) during the presidency of Richard Nixon. He counseled the Senate Commerce Committee with regards to fuel-efficiency standards and supervised the 1974 report by the Ford Foundation titled 'A Time to Choose'. Freeman decided to stop construction on several nuclear projects that may have contributed to several rate increases with TVA. As of 2020, TVA's generation portfolio is 39% nuclear, 19% coal, 26% natural gas, 11% hydro, 3% wind and solar, and 1% energy efficiency. He also headed other major energy organizations, including the New York Power Authority and the Los Angeles Department of Water and Power (LADWP); he was in charge of the latter from 1997 to 2001. After his tenure with the LADWP, Freeman became president of the Los Angeles Board of Harbor Commissioners. He presided over a drive to reduce pollution in the ports of Los Angeles and Long Beach.

=== LCRA ===
Freeman served as the general manager of the Lower Colorado River Authority from 1986-1990. He was hired after a major scandal involving conflicts of interest, nepotism, sexual improprieties, and mismanagement were uncovered. Freeman moved quickly to restore confidence in the utility, firing some officials. He recruited people to restore the utility's reputation. He hired Mark Rose, who had promoted energy efficiency as an Austin City Council member. Subsequently Rose became general manager of LCRA himself. According to Rose, Freeman canceled a massive mining project involving a 12-mile conveyor belt despite political pressure. Rose said, "Before anyone else, he was talking about conservation as a replacement for the central station power plant,” adding that he was three decades ahead of his time. While in Austin, Freeman began wearing his trademark hat and became known as the "Green Cowboy".

=== SMUD ===
Freeman has been termed an "eco-pioneer" for his environmentally-oriented leadership of the Sacramento Municipal Utility District (SMUD). Freeman became general manager of the Sacramento Municipal Utility District in 1990. He has said that SMUD was an embarrassment at that time, and the district was "reeling from two decades of rate hikes, construction cost overruns, operating failures, equipment outages, worker injuries, poor morale and management scandals". Freeman left SMUD in 1994.

According to Freeman, since opening in 1971, Rancho Seco Nuclear Generating Station had "suffered dozens of emergencies, shutdowns, releases of radioactive material and accidents". In 1989, the people of Sacramento voted to close Rancho Seco. SMUD's Board of Directors later hired Freeman, an advocate of public power, to take the helm. Freeman's strategy, reinforced by the board, was to focus intensely on energy efficiency and to invest proactively in renewable energy resources.

To fill the energy resource hole left by the closure of Rancho Seco, Freeman embarked immediately in 1990 on one of the most aggressive energy efficiency programs of any utility at the time and in 1991 hired Donald Osborn, then Director of the University of Arizona Solar & Energy Research Facility, to develop and implement a likewise aggressive solar energy program. Under Freeman's leadership the SMUD PV Pioneer Program began the broad and sustained commercialization of grid-connected, distributed (so-called "rooftop") solar that by 2002 had half of all the grid connected photovoltaic (PV) power of the entire country. The PV Pioneer Program led directly to the California Million Solar Roofs Program and the California Solar Initiative that was responsible for today's thriving and rapidly-growing American solar market.

== Death ==
Freeman died on May 12, 2020, at a hospital in Reston, Virginia, after having a heart attack. He was 94.

== Books ==
Freeman has authored several books, including Energy: The New Era (1974), Winning Our Energy Independence (2007), An All-Electric America: A Climate Solution and the Hopeful Future (2016) and an autobiography, The Green Cowboy: An Energetic Life (2016). Other books that contain his works include Oral history of the Tennessee Valley Authority: Interview with S. David Freeman, March 30, 1984 and Speeches by S. David Freeman (1997).

In Winning Our Energy Independence, he wrote that there is the renewable energy needed to wean society from the Three Poisons: foreign oil, dirty coal, and dangerous nuclear power.

I say this based on my experience as the former head of the TVA, which bought and burned more than 30 million tons of coal a year. I was deeply involved in the strip mining, underground mining, trucking, and most importantly, the burning of huge quantities of coal. No one who has been deeply involved with coal can rightfully say it is clean.

— S. David Freeman in Winning Our Energy Independence: An Energy Insider Shows How (2007), p. 39, ISBN 1423611640
