= Dark Circle (film) =

- Directed by: Judy Irving; Christopher Beaver; Ruth Landy
- Music by: Gary Remal
- Production company: Independent Documentary Group
- Release date: 1982
- Running time: 82 minutes

Dark Circle is a 1982 American documentary film directed and produced by Judy Irving, Christopher Beaver and Ruth Landy that focuses on the connections between the nuclear weapons and the nuclear power industries, with a strong emphasis on the individual human and protracted U.S. environmental costs involved. A clear point made by the film is that while only two bombs were dropped on Japan, many hundreds were exploded in the United States.

The film won the Grand Prize for documentary at the Sundance Film Festival and received a national Emmy Award for "Outstanding individual achievement in news and documentary."

For the opening scenes and about half of its length, the film focuses on the Rocky Flats Plant and its plutonium contamination of the area's environment. The remainder of the film covers the development, wartime usage and prolonged testing of U.S. nuclear weapons, including the creation of plutonium-239 in commercial nuclear power plants such as Diablo Canyon Power Plant. The documentary is unrated. World War II film footage of a Nagasaki bombing survivor whose back and left arm were stripped of skin is shown; scar-covered, he tells his story in the present day. Testing of nuclear weapons on live hogs at skin-searing distances, the Priscilla Test, and U.S. military troops at safer ranges are also featured.

The film closes by highlighting anti-nuclear protest activities directed at the Diablo Canyon Power Plant on the U.S. West Coast, in California. The protesters contend, and the movie supports, the assertion that the protests were responsible for delaying the licensing of the Diablo Canyon Power Plant and, as a result of the delay, the uncovering of serious construction errors was made public just before the plant went online and started producing power. Discovered by a 25-year-old engineer prior to initial criticality, earthquake supports for nuclear piping had been installed backwards. The film documents the protests with substantial up close footage including the moment that this information became known.

== PBS ==
The film was approved for PBS national broadcast in 1985, but that decision was rejected a year later. According to Barry Chase, PBS vice-president for news and public affairs:

It's an advocacy film and it does not provide any opportunity for any viewer who is coming to the subject for the first time to draw any conclusion other than those which the producers hold. Our benchmark here for a long time has been if that's the case we have two choices: We can either not run the film or we can run it with a wraparound representing the other side. We would have done that second option in this case because, cinematically and technically, the film is well done, but it's very bad journalism. We've done this topic four ways from Sunday in the past few years and we don't need this. We can spend 50,000 bucks, or whatever it would take for a good wraparound, on something we haven't done before.

Independent producers alleged censorship. B.J. Bullert commented that the PBS/KQED decision "robbed a national public television audience." He extrapolates this critical remark to the media across the board and its failure to focus public attention on the putative biological hazard of nuclear power.

Regardless, the film premiered on PBS' POV ("Documentaries with a point of view") on 6 August 1989. PBS summarizes the film's thesis as "The Bomb is killing ordinary Americans, even in the absence of a nuclear war."

== Critical reception ==
B. J. Bullert, in her title Public Television: Politics and the Battle over Documentary Film lamented the scuttling of the national broadcast and stated that Dark Circle was outside of the mainstream in making assertions which are now widely accepted. Nat Katzman, former KQED station manager, quoted in Bullert's book, stated "It's more difficult to say (Dark Circle) falsified anything, but it left one with the uncomfortable feeling that this is propaganda, not journalism.

John Hart, for The Seattle Times, said the film "May be the most eloquent, far-ranging and convincing film on the subject to date, as well as the one that offers the best evidence for hope."

Kenneth R. Clark, for the Chicago Tribune, wrote "Dark Circle makes no pretense of journalistic objectivity. It is an advocacy piece wrapped in the nightmare of horrific film footage, much of which until recently has been classified top secret."

== See also ==
- Nevada National Security Site (formerly Nevada Test Site)
- Abalone Alliance
- Mothers for Peace
- Alliance for Nuclear Responsibility
- Kristen Iversen
