= Shoreline Fault =

Shoreline Fault is a 25 km long vertical strike-slip fault discovered in 2008 that lies less than a mile from the Diablo Canyon Nuclear Power Plant in California. It is thought to be able to produce quakes up to 6.8 magnitude. The San Luis Obispo County Board of Supervisors claims that it (along with the Hosgri fault) may potentially pose a threat to the nuclear plant despite the plant's operator, Pacific Gas and Electric, claiming that the facility is able to withstand a 7.5 magnitude quake.
