= Critical Masses =

1998 book written by Thomas Wellock

- Author: Thomas Wellock
- Subject: Anti-nuclear movement in California
- Publisher: University of Wisconsin Press
- Publication date: 1998
- ISBN: 0299158543

Critical Masses: Opposition to Nuclear Power in California, 1958–1978 is a book written by Thomas Wellock, the official historian of the United States Nuclear Regulatory Commission, that details the history of the anti-nuclear movement in California. Reviewer Paula Garb has said:

The book is rich with vivid verbal pictures and the passionate voices of participants on all sides of the controversy around the peaceful atom. It is based on interviews, documents from state and federal archives, and activist papers. Wellock brings to this project the expertise of a former engineer for civilian and navy nuclear reactors, a thorough archivist, and a sensitive interviewer.

== See also ==
- Anti-nuclear movement in California
- Anti-nuclear protests in the United States
- List of books about nuclear issues
- Nuclear power in the United States
- Nuclear whistleblowers
