= Anti-nuclear organizations =

Organizations opposing uranium mining, nuclear power, and/or nuclear weapons

Anti-nuclear organizations may oppose uranium mining, nuclear power, and/or nuclear weapons. Anti-nuclear groups have undertaken public protests and acts of civil disobedience which have included occupations of nuclear plant sites. Some of the most influential groups in the anti-nuclear movement have had members who were elite scientists, including several Nobel Laureates and many nuclear physicists.

== Types of organizations ==
Various types of organizations have identified themselves with the anti-nuclear movement:

- direct action groups, such as the Clamshell Alliance and Shad Alliance;
- environmental groups, such as Friends of the Earth and Greenpeace;
- consumer protection groups, such as Ralph Nader's Critical Mass;
- professional organizations, such as International Physicians for the Prevention of Nuclear War; and
- political parties such as European Free Alliance.

Some of the most influential groups in the anti-nuclear movement have had members who were elite scientists, including several Nobel Laureates and many nuclear physicists. In the United States, these scientists have belonged primarily to three groups: the Union of Concerned Scientists, the Federation of American Scientists, and the Committee for Nuclear Responsibility.

== Activities ==
Anti-nuclear groups have undertaken public protests and acts of civil disobedience which have included occupations of nuclear plant sites. Other salient strategies have included lobbying, petitioning government authorities, influencing public policy through referendum campaigns and involvement in elections. Anti-nuclear groups have also tried to influence policy implementation through litigation and by participating in licensing proceedings.

== International organizations ==
- The ATOM Project, international nonprofit organization seeking entry into force of the Nuclear Nonproliferation Treaty and the limitation of all nuclear arsenals.
- European Nuclear Disarmament, held annual conventions in the 1980s involving thousands of anti-nuclear weapons activists mostly from Western Europe but also from Eastern Europe, the United States, and Australia.
- Friends of the Earth International, a network of environmental organizations in 77 countries.
- Global Zero, international non-partisan group of 300 world leaders dedicated to achieving the elimination of nuclear weapons.
- Global Initiative to Combat Nuclear Terrorism, international partnership of 83 nations.
- Greenpeace International, non-governmental environmental organization with offices in over 41 countries and headquarters in Amsterdam, Netherlands.
- International Campaign to Abolish Nuclear Weapons
- International Network of Engineers and Scientists for Global Responsibility
- International Physicians for the Prevention of Nuclear War, had affiliates in 41 nations in 1985, representing 135,000 physicians; IPPNW was awarded the UNESCO Peace Education Prize in 1984 and the Nobel Peace Prize in 1985.
- Nihon Hidankyo, was awarded the Noble Peace Prize in 2024
- Nuclear Free World Policy
- Nuclear Information and Resource Service
- OPANAL
- Parliamentarians for Nuclear Non-Proliferation and Disarmament, global network of over 700 parliamentarians from more than 75 countries working to prevent nuclear proliferation.
- Pax Christi International, Catholic group which took a "sharply anti-nuclear stand".
- Ploughshares Fund
- Pugwash Conferences on Science and World Affairs
- Socialist International, world body of social democratic parties.
- Sōka Gakkai, a peace-orientated Buddhist organisation, which held anti-nuclear exhibitions in Japanese cities during the late 1970s, and gathered 10 million signatures on petitions calling for the abolition of nuclear weapons.
- The Ribbon International, United Nations Non-Governmental Organization promoting nuclear disarmament.
- United Nations Office for Disarmament Affairs
- World Constitution and Parliament Association
- World Constitution Coordinating Committee
- World Disarmament Campaign
- World Information Service on Energy, based in Amsterdam, the Netherlands
- World Union for Protection of Life
- World Wide Fund for Nature (WWF), calls for a complete phase-out of nuclear energy.

== List of other organizations ==
Many of these groups are listed at "Protest movements against nuclear energy" in Wolfgang Rudig (1990). Anti-nuclear Movements: A World Survey of Opposition to Nuclear Energy, Longman, pp. 381–403.

- Alliance for Nuclear Accountability
- Alliance for Nuclear Responsibility
- Arms Control Association
- Australian Conservation Foundation
- Bellona Foundation
- Campaign Against Nuclear Energy
- Campaign for Nuclear Disarmament
- Campaign for Nuclear Disarmament (NZ)
- Canadian Coalition for Nuclear Responsibility
- Canadian Voice of Women for Peace
- Christian CND
- Citizens' Nuclear Information Center
- Clamshell Alliance
- Coalition for Nuclear Power Postponement
- Committee for Non-Violent Action
- Committee for a Nuclear Free Island
- Committee for Nuclear Responsibility
- Council for a Livable World
- Critical Mass
- Don't Make a Wave Committee
- Earthlife Africa
- East Coast Solidarity for Anti-Nuke Group
- Economists for Peace and Security
- Energy Fair
- Energy Probe
- European Nuclear Disarmament
- Friends of the Earth (EWNI)
- Friends of the Earth Scotland
- Global Security Institute
- Greenpeace Aotearoa New Zealand
- Greenpeace Australia Pacific
- Institute for Energy and Environmental Research
- International Campaign to Abolish Nuclear Weapons
- International Physicians for the Prevention of Nuclear War
- Koeberg Alert
- Labour CND
- Legambiente
- MEDACT
- Middle East Treaty Organization
- Musicians United for Safe Energy
- Natural Resources Defense Council
- Nevada Desert Experience
- Nevada Semipalatinsk
- New England Coalition
- No Nukes group
- No to Nuclear Weapons
- One Less Nuclear Power Plant
- Nuclear Age Peace Foundation
- Nuclear Control Institute
- Nuclear Disarmament Party
- Nuclear Free World Policy
- Nuclear Threat Initiative
- NukeWatch
- Operation Gandhi
- Peace Action
- Peace Boat
- Peace Organisation of Australia
- Pembina Institute
- People's Movement Against Nuclear Energy
- Performers and Artists for Nuclear Disarmament
- Physicians for Social Responsibility
- Plowshares Movement
- Public Citizen Energy Program
- Rocky Flats Truth Force
- Sayonara Nuclear Power Plants
- Scientists against Nuclear Arms
- Scottish Campaign for Nuclear Disarmament
- Seeds of hope
- Shad Alliance
- Sierra Club
- Sortir du nucléaire (Canada)
- Sortir du nucléaire (France)
- Stop Rokkasho
- The Seneca Women's Encampment for a Future of Peace and Justice
- The Wilderness Society (Australia)
- Top Level Group
- Trident Ploughshares
- Two Futures Project
- White House Peace Vigil
- Women from Fukushima Against Nukes
- Women Strike for Peace
- Women's Action for New Directions (WAND) previously called Women's Action for Nuclear Disarmament, forerunner organization: Women's Party for Survival
- Women's International League for Peace and Freedom
- World Nuclear Industry Status Report

== See also ==
- Anti-nuclear groups in the United States
- International Day for the Total Elimination of Nuclear Weapons
- List of anti-nuclear power groups
- Anti-nuclear protests in the United States
- List of books about nuclear issues
- List of companies in the nuclear sector
- List of nuclear power groups
- List of Nuclear-Free Future Award recipients
- List of renewable energy organizations
- List of anti-war organizations
- List of peace activists
- Non-nuclear future
- Nuclear organizations (Wikipedia category)
