= List of anti–nuclear power groups =

Anti-nuclear power groups have emerged in every country that has had a nuclear power programme. Protest movements against nuclear power first emerged in the US, at the local level, and spread quickly to Europe and the rest of the world. National nuclear campaigns emerged in the late 1970s. Fuelled by the Three Mile Island accident and the Chernobyl disaster, the anti-nuclear power movement mobilised political and economic forces which for some years "made nuclear energy untenable in many countries".

Some of these anti-nuclear power organisations are reported to have developed considerable expertise on nuclear power and energy issues. In 1992, the chairman of the Nuclear Regulatory Commission said that "his agency had been pushed in the right direction on safety issues because of the pleas and protests of nuclear watchdog groups".

== International ==
- Friends of the Earth International, a network of environmental organizations in 77 countries.
- Greenpeace International, a non-governmental environmental organization with offices in over 41 countries and headquarters in Amsterdam, Netherlands.
- International Network of Engineers and Scientists for Global Responsibility
- Nuclear Information and Resource Service
- Pax Christi International, a Catholic group which took a "sharply anti-nuclear stand".
- Pugwash Conferences on Science and World Affairs
- Socialist International, the world body of social democratic parties.
- Sōka Gakkai, a peace-orientated Buddhist organisation, which held anti-nuclear exhibitions in Japanese cities during the late 1970s, and gathered 10 million signatures on petitions calling for the abolition of nuclear weapons.
- World Information Service on Energy, based in Amsterdam, the Netherlands
- World Nuclear Industry Status Report
- World Union for Protection of Life
- World Wildlife Fund

== Australia ==
- Campaign Against Nuclear Energy
- Greenpeace Australia Pacific

== Canada ==
- Canadian Coalition for Nuclear Responsibility
- Pembina Institute
- Sortir du nucléaire (Canada)

== France ==
- Sortir du nucléaire (France)
- CRIIRAD
- Groupement des scientifiques pour l'information sur l'énergie nucléaire

== Japan ==
- Citizens' Nuclear Information Center
- Green Action Japan

== New Zealand ==
- Greenpeace Aotearoa New Zealand

== South Africa ==
- Koeberg Alert

== Spain ==
- ETA

== United Kingdom ==
- Friends of the Earth (EWNI)
- Friends of the Earth Scotland
- Sustainable Development Commission

== United States ==
- Arms Control Association
- Abalone Alliance
- Clamshell Alliance
- Institute for Energy and Environmental Research
- Musicians United for Safe Energy
- Natural Resources Defense Council
- New England Coalition
- Shad Alliance
- Sierra Club

== See also ==
- List of nuclear power groups
- Non-nuclear future
- List of anti-nuclear groups in the United States
