= Anti-nuclear groups in the United States =

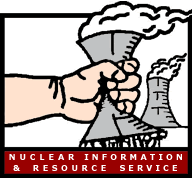

More than 80 anti-nuclear groups are operating, or have operated, in the United States. These include Abalone Alliance, Clamshell Alliance, Greenpeace USA, Institute for Energy and Environmental Research, Musicians United for Safe Energy, Nevada Desert Experience, Nuclear Control Institute, Nuclear Information and Resource Service, Public Citizen Energy Program, Shad Alliance, and the Sierra Club. These are direct action, environmental, health, and public interest organizations who oppose nuclear weapons and/or nuclear power. In 1992, the chairman of the Nuclear Regulatory Commission said that "his agency had been pushed in the right direction on safety issues because of the pleas and protests of nuclear watchdog groups".

Some of the most influential groups in the anti-nuclear movement have had members who included Nobel Laureates (e.g., Linus Pauling and Hermann Joseph Muller). These scientists have belonged primarily to two groups: the Federation of American Scientists, and the Committee for Nuclear Responsibility.

== Specific groups ==
Groups include:

- Abalone Alliance
- Alliance for Nuclear Accountability
- Alliance for Nuclear Responsibility
- Alliance for Survival (Los Angeles; defunct)
- Arms Control Association.
- Beyond Nuclear (Takoma Park, Maryland)
- Cactus Alliance (Utah)
- Catfish Alliance (Alabama)
- Citizen's Committee for Protection of the Environment
- Citizens Energy Council
- Clamshell Alliance
- Coalition Against Nukes
- Coalition for Nuclear Power Postponement
- Committee for a Nuclear Free Island
- Committee for a Nuclear Overkill Moratorium
- Committee for Nuclear Responsibility
- Concerned Citizens Against the Bailly Nuclear Site
- Corporate Accountability International
- Council for a Livable World
- Crabshell Alliance (Seattle)
- Critical Mass
- Don't Make a Wave Committee
- Economists for Peace and Security
- Environmental Coalition on Nuclear Power
- Federation of American Scientists
- Friends of the Earth
- Greenpeace
- Heart of America Northwest
- Institute for Energy and Environmental Research
- Maryland Public Interest Research Group
- Mothers for Peace
- Musicians United for Safe Energy
- Nevada Desert Experience
- New England Coalition
- North Anna Environmental Coalition
- Nuclear Age Peace Foundation
- Nuclear Control Institute
- Nuclear Disarmament Partnership
- Nuclear Energy Information Service
- Nuclear Information and Resource Service
- Nuclear Policy Research Institute
- Nuclear Threat Initiative
- Nuclear Watch of New Mexico
- Nuclear Watch South
- Oystershell Alliance (New Orleans)
- Palmetto Alliance (South Carolina)
- Peace Action
- Physicians for Social Responsibility
- Pilgrim Watch
- Plowshares Movement
- Proposition One Campaign for a Nuclear-Free Future
- Public Citizen
- Red Clover Alliance (Vermont)
- Riverkeeper
- Rocky Flats Truth Force
- Seneca Women's Encampment for a Future of Peace and Justice
- Shad Alliance
- Shundahai Network
- Sierra Club
- Southern Alliance for Clean Energy
- Three Mile Island Alert
- Tri-Valley CAREs (Livermore, CA)
- Trojan Decommissioning Alliance
- Two Futures Project
- Western States Legal Foundation
- White House Peace Vigil
- Wisconsin Project on Nuclear Arms Control
- Women Strike for Peace
- Women's International League for Peace & Freedom, US Section

== See also ==
- Anti-nuclear protests in the United States
- Environmental movement in the United States
- List of anti-nuclear groups
- List of books about nuclear issues
- List of companies in the nuclear sector
- List of nuclear power groups
- Nuclear accidents in the United States
- Nuclear energy policy
- Nuclear power in the United States
- Nuclear safety in the U.S.
- Nuclear whistleblowers
