= Environmental movement in the United States =

Organized environmental movement in the US

Environmental issues in the United States include the following subject areas: climate change, energy production and consumption, species conservation, the spread of invasive species, deforestation, mining, nuclear incidents, pesticide use, pollution, waste management, and population growth. While many diverse attempts of utilizing policy change to mitigate different climate crises have taken place over the years, still society is faced with environmental challenges. The United States is one of the largest emitters of greenhouse gases globally, both in total emissions and on a per capita basis.[2] As a major economic and political power, U.S. climate policy has a large influence on what measures and efforts are put forth concerning environmental regulations at the national level, leveraging their influence through diplomatic measures.

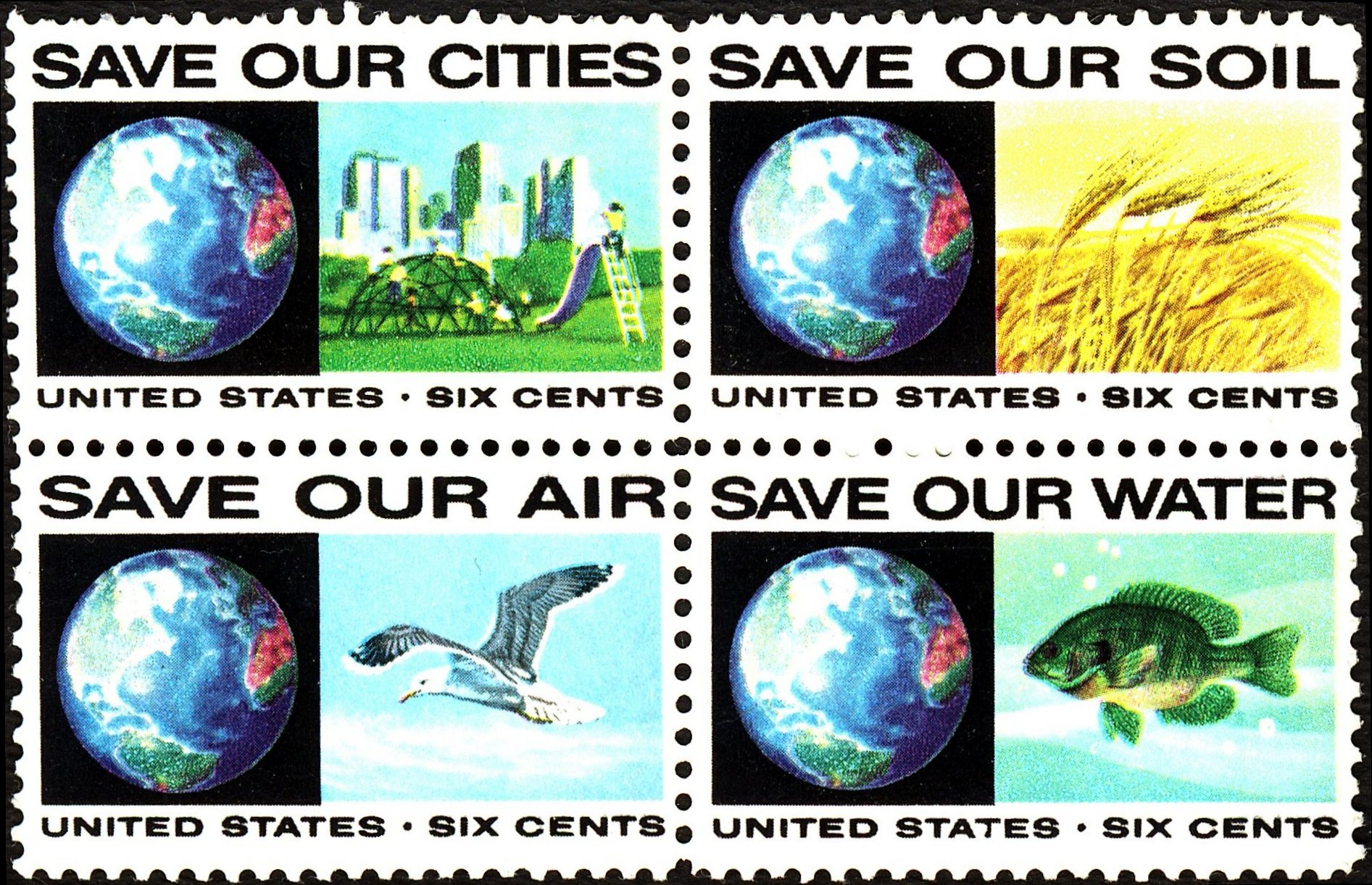
1970s US postage stamp block with a theme of pollution prevention

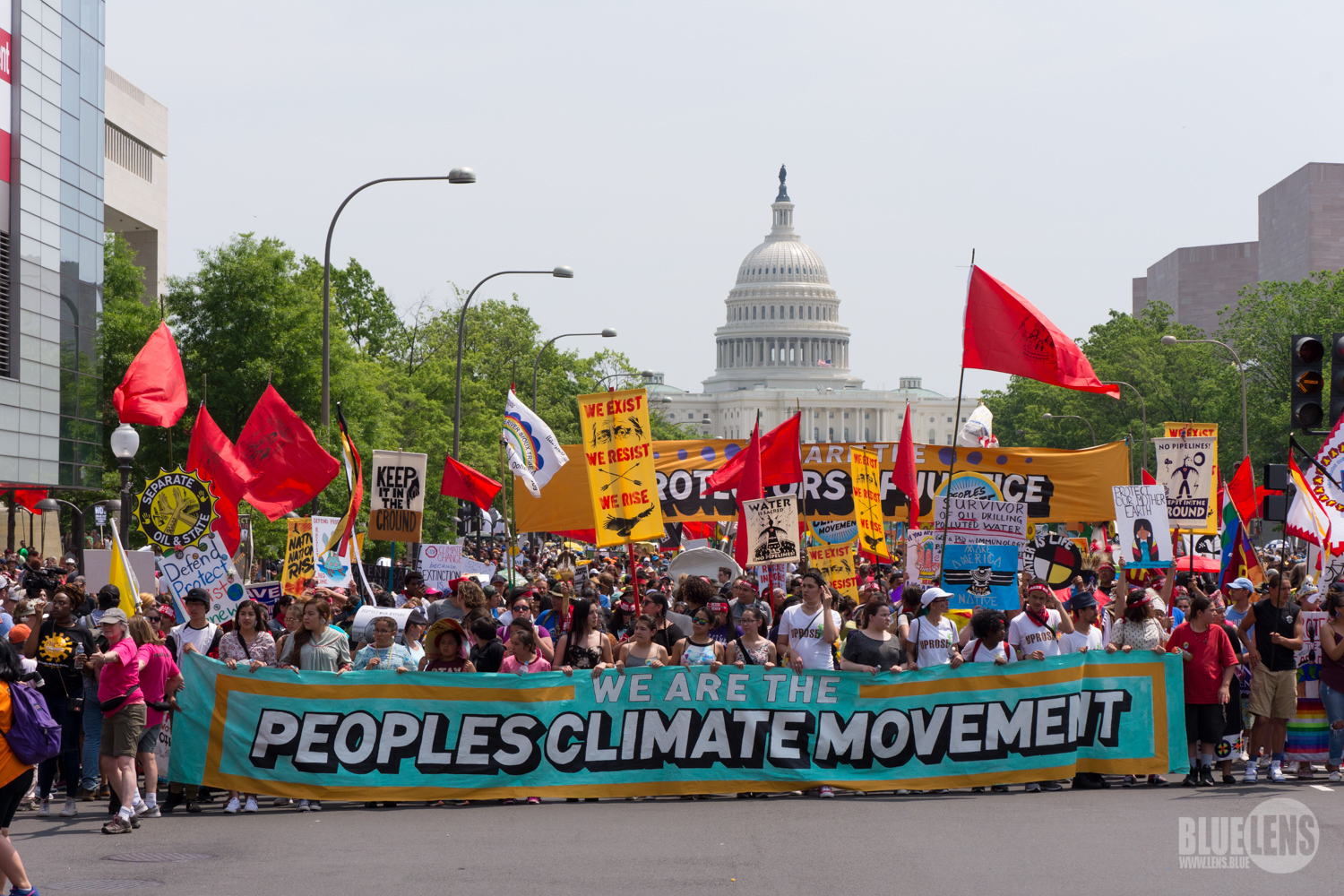
People's Climate March (2017)

Organized environmental movements consist of a variety of activists, many of whom are represented by a wide range of environmentally-focused non-governmental organizations (NGOs). Despite their non-government affiliations, such environmental movements still operate and influence governments at the local, national, and international level.

The environmental movement today consists of both large national groups and also many smaller local groups with local concerns. Some resemble the old U.S. conservation movement – whose modern expression is The Nature Conservancy, Audubon Society and National Geographic Society – American organizations with a worldwide influence. Increasingly that movement is organized around addressing climate change in the United States alongside interrelated issues like climate justice and broader environmental justice issues.

== Issues ==
Of the major greenhouse gas-emitting nations, the U.S. is among the highest per person emitters.

Annual CO_{2} emissions, total by country (2017 data) shows the U.S. trails China in total annual emissions (not per capita).

Environmental issues in the United States include climate change, energy, species conservation, invasive species, deforestation, mining, nuclear accidents, pesticides, pollution, waste and overpopulation. Despite taking hundreds of measures, environmental issues are increasing rapidly instead of decreasing. The United States is among the most significant emitters of greenhouse gases in the world. In terms of both total and per capita emissions, it is among the largest contributors. The climate policy of the United States has a major influence on the world.

== Scope of the movement ==
- The early Conservation movement, which began in the late 19th century, included fisheries and wildlife management, water, soil conservation and sustainable forestry. Today it includes sustainable yield of natural resources, preservation of wilderness areas and biodiversity.
- The modern Environmental movement, which began in the 1960s with concern about air and water pollution, became broader in scope to include all landscapes and human activities. See List of environmental issues.
- Environmental health movement dating at least to Progressive Era (the 1890s - 1920s) urban reforms including clean water supply, more efficient removal of raw sewage and reduction in crowded and unsanitary living conditions. Today Environmental health is more related to nutrition, preventive medicine, ageing well and other concerns specific to the human body's well-being.
- Sustainability movement which started in the 1980s focused on Gaia theory, value of Earth and other interrelations between human sciences and human responsibilities. Its spinoff deep ecology was more spiritual but often claimed to be science.

As public awareness and the environmental sciences have improved in recent years, environmental issues have broadened to include key concepts such as "sustainability" and also new emerging concerns such as ozone depletion, global warming, acid rain, land use and biogenetic pollution.

Environmental movements often interact or are linked with other social movements, e.g. for peace, human rights, and animal rights; and against nuclear weapons and/or nuclear power, endemic diseases, poverty, hunger, etc.

Some US colleges are now going green by signing the "President's Climate Commitment," a document that a college President can sign to enable said colleges to practice environmentalism by switching to solar power, etc.

Membership of selected US environmental organizations (thousands)
	1971	1981	1992	1997	2004
Sierra Club (1892)	124	246	615	569	736
National Audubon Society (1905)	115	400	600	550	550
National Parks Conservation Association (1919)	49	27	230	375	375
Izaak Walton League (1922)	54	48	51	42	45
Wilderness Society (1935)	62	52	365	237	225
National Wildlife Federation (1936)	540	818	997	650	650
Defenders of Wildlife (1947)	13	50	77	215	463
The Nature Conservancy (1951)	22	80	545	865	972
WWF-US (1961)	n.a.	n.a.	970	1,200	1,200
Environmental Defense Fund (1967)	20	46	175	300	350
Friends of the Earth (US) (1969)	7	25	30	20	35
Natural Resources Defense Council (1970)	5	40	170	260	450
Greenpeace USA (1975)	n.a.	n.a.	2,225	400	250

== History ==
Native Americans are frequently categorized as "the original environmentalists", however this assertion is frequently challenged for being overly simplistic. Early European settlers came to the United States brought from Europe the concept of the commons. In the colonial era, access to natural resources was allocated by individual towns, and disputes over fisheries or land use were resolved at the local level. Changing technologies, however, strained traditional ways of resolving disputes of resource use, and local governments had limited control over powerful special interests. For example, the damming of rivers for mills cut off upriver towns from fisheries; logging and clearing of forest in watersheds harmed local fisheries downstream. In New England, many farmers became uneasy as they noticed clearing of the forest changed stream flows and a decrease in bird population which helped control insects and other pests. These concerns become widely known with the publication of Man and Nature (1864) by George Perkins Marsh. The environmental impact method of analysis is generally the main mode for determining what issues the environmental movement is involved in. This model is used to determine how to proceed in situations that are detrimental to the environment by choosing the way that is least damaging and has the fewest lasting implications.

=== Conservation movement ===
Conservation first became a national issue during the progressive era's conservation movement (1890s - 1920s). The early national conservation movement shifted emphasis to scientific management which favored larger enterprises and control began to shift from local governments to the states and the federal government.(Judd) Some writers credit sportsmen, hunters and fishermen with the increasing influence of the conservation movement. In the 1870s sportsman magazines such as American Sportsmen, Forest and Stream, and Field and Stream are seen as leading to the growth of the conservation movement.(Reiger) This conservation movement also urged the establishment of state and national parks and forests, wildlife refuges, and national monuments intended to preserve noteworthy natural features. Conservation groups focus primarily on an issue that's origins are rooted in general expansion. As industrialization became more prominent as well as the increasing trend towards urbanization the conservative environmental movement began. Contrary to popular belief conservation groups are not against expansion in general, instead, they are concerned with efficiency with resources and land development.

=== Progressive era ===
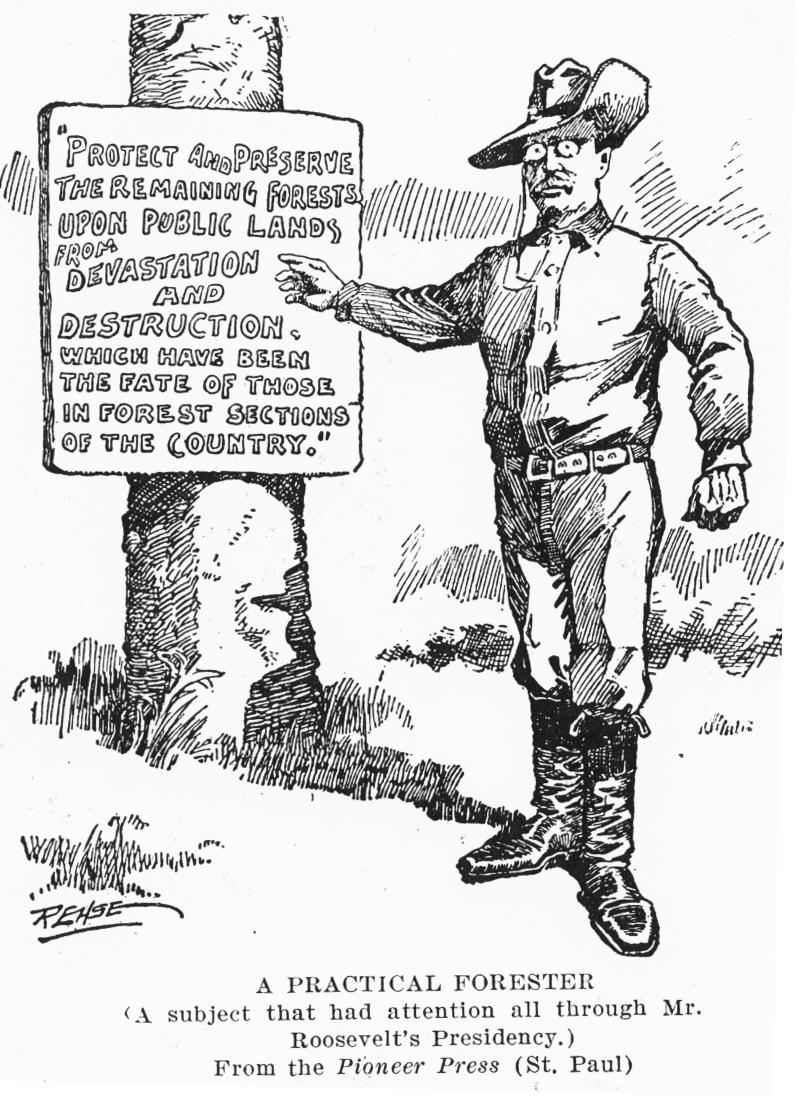
The conservation policies of Theodore Roosevelt

Theodore Roosevelt and his close ally George Bird Grinnell, were motivated by the wanton waste that was taking place at the hand of market hunting. This practice resulted in placing a large number of North American game species on the edge of extinction. Roosevelt recognized that the laissez-faire approach of the U.S. Government was too wasteful and inefficient. In any case, they noted, most of the natural resources in the western states were already owned by the federal government. The best course of action, they argued, was a long-term plan devised by national experts to maximize the long-term economic benefits of natural resources. To accomplish the mission, Roosevelt and Grinnell formed the Boone and Crockett Club in 1887. The club was made up of the best minds and influential men of the day. The Boone and Crockett Club's contingency of conservationists, scientists, politicians, and intellectuals became Roosevelt's closest advisers during his march to preserve wildlife and habitat across North America. As president, Theodore Roosevelt became a prominent conservationist, putting the issue high on the national agenda. He worked with all the major figures of the movement, especially his chief advisor on the matter, Gifford Pinchot. Roosevelt was deeply committed to conserving natural resources and is considered to be the nation's first conservation President. He encouraged the Newlands Reclamation Act of 1902 to promote federal construction of dams to irrigate small farms and placed 230,000,000 acres (93,000,000 ha) under federal protection. Roosevelt set aside more Federal land for national parks and nature preserves than all of his predecessors combined.

Roosevelt established the United States Forest Service, signed into law the creation of five National Parks, and signed the 1906 Antiquities Act, under which he proclaimed 18 new U.S. National Monuments. He also established the first 51 Bird Reserves, four Game Preserves, and 150 National Forests, including Shoshone National Forest, the nation's first. The area of the United States that he placed under public protection totals approximately 230,000,000 acres (930,000 km^{2}).

Gifford Pinchot had been appointed by McKinley as chief of Division of Forestry in the Department of Agriculture. In 1905, his department gained control of the national forest reserves. Pinchot promoted private use (for a fee) under federal supervision. In 1907, Roosevelt designated sixteen million acres (65,000 km^{2}) of new national forests just minutes before a deadline.

In May 1908, Roosevelt sponsored the Conference of Governors held in the White House, with a focus on natural resources and their most efficient use. Roosevelt delivered the opening address: "Conservation as a National Duty."

In 1903 Roosevelt toured the Yosemite Valley with John Muir, who had a very different view of conservation and tried to minimize commercial use of water resources and forests. Working through the Sierra Club he founded, Muir succeeded in 1905 in having Congress transfer the Mariposa Grove and Yosemite Valley to the National Park Service. While Muir wanted nature preserved for the sake of pure beauty, Roosevelt subscribed to Pinchot's formulation, "to make the forest produce the largest amount of whatever crop or service will be most useful, and keep on producing it for generation after generation of men and trees." Muir and the Sierra Club vehemently opposed the damming of the Hetch Hetchy Valley in Yosemite in order to provide water to the city of San Francisco. Roosevelt and Pinchot supported the dam, as did President Woodrow Wilson. The Hetch Hetchy dam was finished in 1923 and is still in operation, but the Sierra Club still wants to tear it down.

Other influential conservationists of the Progressive Era included George Bird Grinnell (a prominent sportsman who founded the Boone and Crockett Club), the Izaak Walton League and John Muir, the founder of the Sierra Club in 1892. Conservationists organized the National Parks Conservation Association, the Audubon Society, and other groups that still remain active.

=== New Deal ===
Franklin Delano Roosevelt (1933–45), like his cousin Theodore Roosevelt, was an ardent conservationist. He used numerous programs of the departments of Agriculture and Interior to end wasteful land-use, mitigate the effects of the Dust Bowl, and efficiently develop natural resources in the West. One of the most popular of all New Deal programs was the Civilian Conservation Corps (1933–1943), which sent two million poor young men to work in rural and wilderness areas, primarily on conservation projects.

=== Post-1945 ===
After World War II increasing encroachment on wilderness land evoked the continued resistance of conservationists, who succeeded in blocking a number of projects in the 1950s and 1960s, including the proposed Bridge Canyon Dam that would have backed up the waters of the Colorado River into the Grand Canyon National Park.

The Inter-American Conference on the Conservation of Renewable Natural Resources met in 1948 as a collection of nearly 200 scientists from all over the Americans forming the trusteeship principle that:

"No generation can exclusively own the renewable resources by which it lives. We hold the commonwealth in trust for prosperity, and to lessen or destroy it is to commit treason against the future"

==== Beginning of the modern movement ====
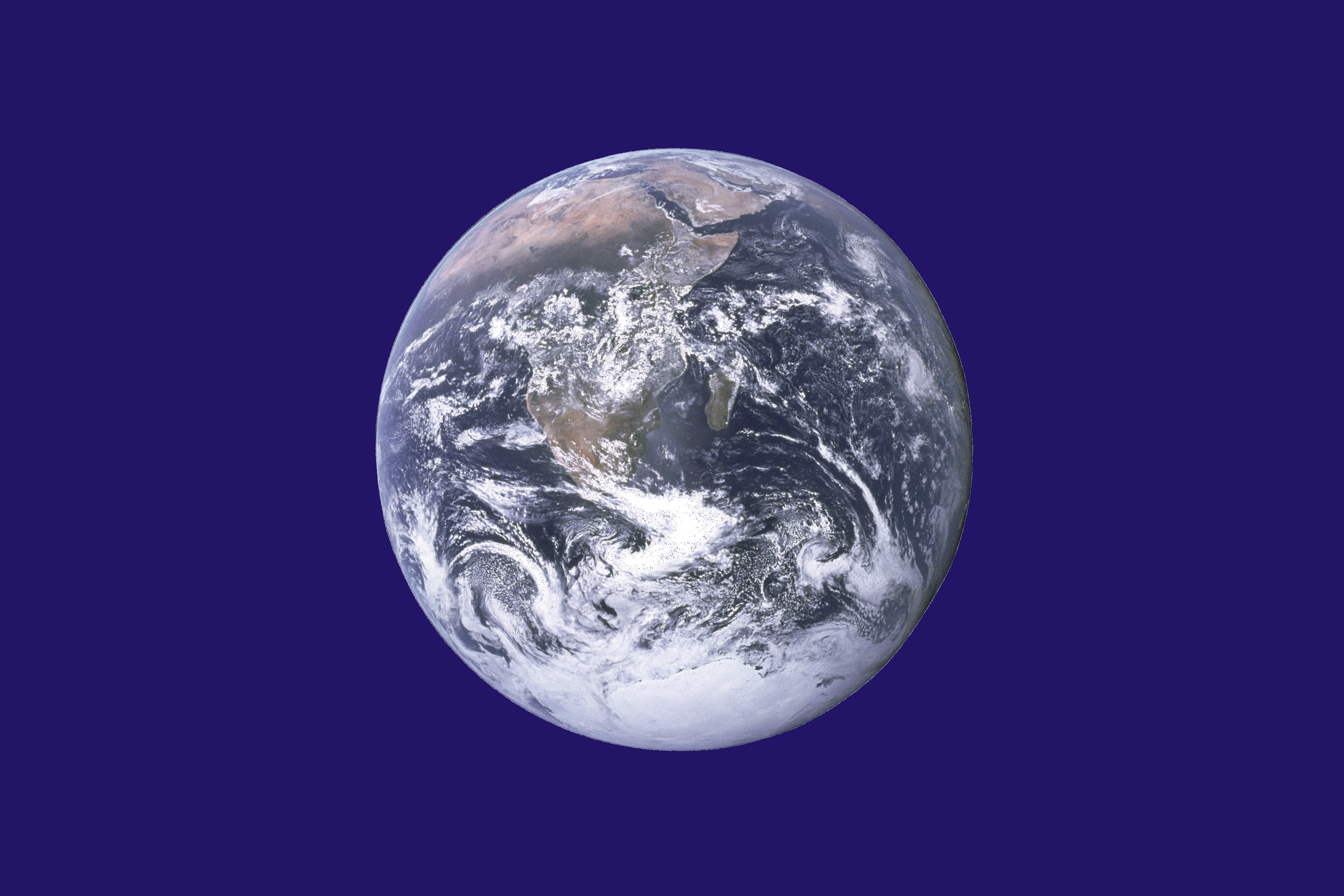
Earth Day flag

During the 1950s, 1960s and 1970s, several events occurred which raised the public awareness of harm to the environment caused by man. In 1954, the 23 man crew of the Japanese fishing vessel Lucky Dragon was exposed to radioactive fallout from a hydrogen bomb test at Bikini Atoll. By 1969, the public reaction to an ecologically catastrophic oil spill from an offshore well in California's Santa Barbara Channel, Barry Commoner's protest against nuclear testing, along with Rachel Carson's 1962 book Silent Spring, and Paul R. Ehrlich's The Population Bomb (1968) all added anxiety about the environment. Pictures of Earth from space emphasized that the earth was small and fragile.

As the public became more aware of environmental issues, concern about air pollution, water pollution, solid waste disposal, dwindling energy resources, radiation, pesticide poisoning (particularly use of DDT as described in Carson's influential Silent Spring), noise pollution, and other environmental problems engaged a broadening number of sympathizers. That public support for environmental concerns was widespread became clear in the Earth Day demonstrations of 1970.

Several books after the middle of the 20th century contributed to the rise of American environmentalism (as distinct from the longer-established conservation movement), especially among college and university students and the more literate public. One was the publication of the first textbook on ecology, Fundamentals of Ecology, by Eugene Odum and Howard Odum, in 1953. Another was the appearance of the Carson's 1962 best-seller Silent Spring. Her book brought about a whole new interpretation of pesticides by exposing their harmful effects in nature. From this book, many began referring to Carson as the "mother of the environmental movement". Another influential development was a 1965 lawsuit, Scenic Hudson Preservation Conference v. Federal Power Commission, opposing the construction of a power plant on Storm King Mountain in New York (state), which is said to have given birth to modern United States environmental law. The wide popularity of The Whole Earth Catalogs, starting in 1968, was quite influential among the younger, hands-on, activist generation of the 1960s and 1970s. Recently, in addition to opposing environmental degradation and protecting wilderness, an increased focus on coexisting with natural biodiversity has appeared, a strain that is apparent in the movement for sustainable agriculture and in the concept of Reconciliation Ecology.

During his time as U.S President, Lyndon Johnson would sign over 300 environment protection measures into law. This was credited as forming the legal basis of the modern environmental movement.

==== Wilderness preservation ====
In the modern wilderness preservation movement, important philosophical roles are played by the writings of John Muir who had been activist in the late 19th and early 20th century. Along with Muir perhaps most influential in the modern movement is Henry David Thoreau who published Walden in 1854. Also important was forester and ecologist Aldo Leopold, one of the founders of the Wilderness Society in 1935, who wrote a classic of nature observation and ethical philosophy, A Sand County Almanac, (1949).

There is also a growing movement of campers and other people who enjoy outdoor recreation activities to help preserve the environment while spending time in the wilderness.

==== Anti-nuclear movement ====
The anti-nuclear movement in the United States consists of more than 80 anti-nuclear groups that have acted to oppose nuclear power or nuclear weapons, or both, in the United States. These groups include the Abalone Alliance, Clamshell Alliance, Institute for Energy and Environmental Research, Nuclear Information and Resource Service, and Physicians for Social Responsibility. The anti-nuclear movement has delayed construction or halted commitments to build some new nuclear plants, and has pressured the Nuclear Regulatory Commission to enforce and strengthen the safety regulations for nuclear power plants.

Anti-nuclear protests reached a peak in the 1970s and 1980s and grew out of the environmental movement. Campaigns which captured national public attention involved the Calvert Cliffs Nuclear Power Plant, Seabrook Station Nuclear Power Plant, Diablo Canyon Power Plant, Shoreham Nuclear Power Plant, and Three Mile Island. On June 12, 1982, one million people demonstrated in New York City's Central Park against nuclear weapons and for an end to the Cold War arms race. It was the largest anti-nuclear protest and the largest political demonstration in American history. International Day of Nuclear Disarmament protests were held on June 20, 1983, at 50 sites across the United States. There were many Nevada Desert Experience protests and peace camps at the Nevada Test Site during the 1980s and 1990s.

More recent campaigning by anti-nuclear groups has related to several nuclear power plants including the Enrico Fermi Nuclear Power Plant, Indian Point Energy Center, Oyster Creek Nuclear Generating Station, Pilgrim Nuclear Generating Station, Salem Nuclear Power Plant, and Vermont Yankee Nuclear Power Plant. There have also been campaigns relating to the Y-12 Nuclear Weapons Plant, the Idaho National Laboratory, proposed Yucca Mountain nuclear waste repository, the Hanford Site, the Nevada Test Site, Lawrence Livermore National Laboratory, and transportation of nuclear waste from the Los Alamos National Laboratory.

Some scientists and engineers have expressed reservations about nuclear power, including: Barry Commoner, S. David Freeman, John Gofman, Arnold Gundersen, Mark Z. Jacobson, Amory Lovins, Arjun Makhijani, Gregory Minor, Joseph Romm and Benjamin K. Sovacool. Scientists who have opposed nuclear weapons include Linus Pauling and Eugene Rabinowitch.

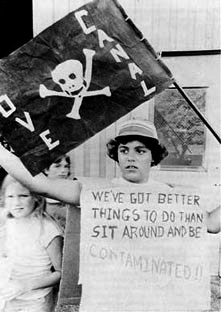
Protest about the Love Canal contamination by a resident, ca. 1978

==== Antitoxics groups ====
Antitoxics groups are a subgroup that is affiliated with the Environmental Movement in the United States, that is primarily concerned with the effects that cities and their by-products have on humans. This aspect of the movement is a self-proclaimed "movement of housewives". Concern around the issues of groundwater contamination and air pollution rose in the early 1980s and individuals involved in antitoxics groups claim that they are concerned for the health of their families. A prominent case can be seen in the Love Canal Homeowner's association (LCHA); in this case, a housing development was built on a site that had been used for toxic dumping by the Hooker Chemical Company. As a result of this dumping, the residents had symptoms of skin irritation, Lois Gibbs, a resident of the development, started a grassroots campaign for reparations. Eventual success led to the government having to purchase homes that were sold in the development.

==== Federal legislation in the 1970s ====
Prior to the 1970s the protection of basic air and water supplies was a matter mainly left to each state. During the 1970s, the primary responsibility for clean air and water shifted to the federal government. Growing concerns, both environmental and economic, from cities and towns as well as sportsman and other local groups, and senators such as Maine's Edmund S. Muskie, led to the passage of extensive legislation, notably the Clean Air Act of 1970 and the Water Pollution Control Act Amendments of 1972. Other legislation included the 1970 National Environmental Policy Act (NEPA), which established the Council on Environmental Quality; the Marine Protection, Research, and Sanctuaries Act of 1972; the Endangered Species Act of 1973, the Safe Drinking Water Act (1974), the Resource Conservation and Recovery Act (1976), the Water Pollution Control Act Amendments of 1977, which became known as the Clean Water Act, and the Comprehensive Environmental Response, Compensation, and Liability Act, commonly known as the Superfund Act (1980). These laws regulated public drinking water systems, toxic substances, pesticides, and ocean dumping; and protected wildlife, wilderness, and wild and scenic rivers. Moreover, the new laws provide for pollution research, standard setting, contaminated site cleanup, monitoring, and enforcement.

The creation of these laws led to a major shift in the environmental movement. Groups such as the Sierra Club shifted focus from local issues to becoming a lobby in Washington and new groups, for example, the Natural Resources Defense Council and Environmental Defense, arose to influence politics as well. (Larson)

=== Renewed focus on local action ===
In the 1980s, President Ronald Reagan sought to curtail the scope of environmental protection taking steps such as appointing James G. Watt. The major environmental groups responded with mass mailings which led to increased membership and donations.

When industry groups lobbied to weaken regulation and a backlash against environmental regulations, the so-called wise use movement gained importance and influence.(Larson)

=== Attacks on environmental activists ===
In the early 1990s, multiple environmental activists in the United States became targets of arson attacks. In 1991, Greenpeace toxics researcher Pat Costner’s Arkansas home was set on fire, and Maine anti-logging activist Michael Vernon narrowly escaped a similar attack. In October 1993, Leroy Jackson, a Native American environmentalist, was found dead in his van in New Mexico shortly before he was scheduled to testify in Washington, D.C., against the clearcutting of old-growth trees on Navajo land.

=== "Post-environmentalism" ===
In 2004, with the environmental movement seemingly stalled, some environmentalists started questioning whether "environmentalism" was even a useful political framework. According to a controversial essay titled "The Death of Environmentalism" (Michael Shellenberger and Ted Nordhaus, 2004) American environmentalism has been remarkably successful in protecting the air, water, and large stretches of wilderness in North America and Europe, but these environmentalists have stagnated as a vital force for cultural and political change.

Shellenberger and Nordhaus wrote, "Today environmentalism is just another special interest. Evidence for this can be found in its concepts, its proposals, and its reasoning. What stands out is how arbitrary environmental leaders are about what gets counted and what doesn't as 'environmental.' Most of the movement's leading thinkers, funders, and advocates do not question their most basic assumptions about who we are, what we stand for, and what it is that we should be doing." Their essay was followed by a speech in San Francisco called "Is Environmentalism Dead?" by former Sierra Club President, Adam Werbach, who argued for the evolution of environmentalism into a more expansive, relevant and powerful progressive politics. Werbach endorsed building an environmental movement that is more relevant to average Americans and controversially chose to lead Wal-Mart's effort to take sustainability mainstream.

These "post-environmental movement" thinkers argue that the ecological crises the human species faces in the 21st century are qualitatively different from the problems the environmental movement was created to address in the 1960s and 1970s. They argue that climate change and habitat destruction are global and more complex, therefore demanding far deeper transformations of the economy, the culture and political life. The consequence of environmentalism's outdated and arbitrary definition, they argue, is a political irrelevancy.

These "politically neutral" groups tend to avoid global conflicts and view the settlement of inter-human conflict as separate from regard for nature – in direct contradiction to the ecology movement and peace movement which have increasingly close links: while Green Parties, Greenpeace, and groups like the ACTivist Magazine regard ecology, biodiversity, and an end to non-human extinction as an absolute basis for peace, the local groups may not, and see a high degree of global competition and conflict as justifiable if it lets them preserve their own local uniqueness. However, such groups tend not to "burn out" and to sustain for long periods, even generations, protecting the same local treasures.

Local groups increasingly find that they benefit from collaboration, e.g. on consensus decision-making methods, or making simultaneous policy, or relying on common legal resources, or even sometimes a common glossary. However, the differences between the various groups that make up the modern environmental movement tend to outweigh such similarities, and they rarely co-operate directly except on a few major global questions. In a notable exception, over 1,000 local groups from around the country united for a single day of action as part of the Step It Up 2007 campaign for real solutions to global warming.

Groups such as The Bioregional Revolution are calling on the need to bridge these differences, as the converging problems of the 21st century they claim compel the people to unite and to take decisive action. They promote bioregionalism, permaculture, and local economies as solutions to these problems, overpopulation, global warming, global epidemics, and water scarcity, but most notably to "peak oil" – the prediction that the country is likely to reach a maximum in global oil production which could spell drastic changes in many aspects of the residents' everyday lives.

=== Timeline of US environmental history ===
- 1832 – Hot Springs Reservation
- 1864 – Yosemite Valley
- 1872 – Yellowstone National Park
- 1892 – Sierra Club
- 1916 – National Park Service Organic Act
- 1916 – National Audubon Society
- 1949 – UN Scientific Conference on the Conservation and Utilization of Resources
- 1961 – World Wildlife Foundation
- 1964 – Land and Water Conservation Act
- 1964 – National Wilderness Preservation System
- 1968 – National Trails System Act
- 1968 – National Wild and Scenic Rivers System/Wild and Scenic Rivers Act
- 1969 – National Environmental Policy Act
- 1970 – First Earth Day- 22 April
- 1970 – Clean Air Act
- 1970 – Environmental Protection Agency
- 1971 – Greenpeace
- 1972 – Clean Water Act
- 1973 – Endangered Species Act
- 1980 – Earth First!
- 1992 – UN Earth Summit in Rio de Janeiro
- 1997 – Kyoto Protocol commits state parties to reduce greenhouse gas emissions
- 2017 – First National CleanUp Day
- 2022 – Inflation Reduction Act

== Criticisms ==
Some people are skeptical of the environmental movement and feel that it is more deeply rooted in politics than science. Although there have been serious debates about climate change and effects of some pesticides and herbicides that mimic animal sex steroids, science has shown that some of the claims of environmentalists have credence.

Novelist Michael Crichton appeared before the U.S. Senate Committee on Environment and Public Works on September 28, 2005, to address concerns and recommended the employment of double-blind experimentation in environmental research. Crichton suggested that because environmental issues are so political in nature, policymakers need neutral, conclusive data to base their decisions on, rather than conjecture and rhetoric, and double-blind experiments are the most efficient way to achieve that aim.

A consistent theme acknowledged by both supporters and critics (though more commonly vocalized by critics) of the environmental movement is that we know very little about the Earth we live in. Most fields of environmental studies are relatively new, and therefore what research we have is limited and does not date far enough back for us to completely understand long-term environmental trends. This has led a number of environmentalists to support the use of the precautionary principle in policy-making, which ultimately asserts that we don't know how certain actions may affect the environment and because there is reason to believe they may cause more harm than good we should refrain from such actions.

=== Elitist ===
In the December 1994 Wild Forest Review, Alexander Cockburn and Jeffrey St. Clair wrote "The mainstream environmental movement was elitist, highly paid, detached from the people, indifferent to the working class, and a firm ally of big government....The environmental movement is now accurately perceived as just another well-financed and cynical special interest group, its rancid infrastructure supported by Democratic Party operatives and millions in grants from corporate foundations."

Many environmental organizations lack diversity, including often white women as the main demographic. However, environmental problems are experienced differently by different social groups, including black versus white groups. For the middle class white population in the US, environmental issues have often included pollution, barriers to recreational activities, etc.. On the other hand, for people of color, environmental issues were often life or death including issues of "smoke, soot, dust, . . . fumes gases, stench, and carbon monoxide." In the past environmental organizations have focused "on preserving natural resources and endangered species instead of protecting people of color from hazardous waste sites being built in their communities". When environmental organizations appoint people of color to positions of leadership, the focus will often shift more towards focus on these major, life-threatening issues. However, a significant 2014 State of Diversity in Environmental Organizations study found that the percentage of minorities working for environmental organizations has never exceeded 16% and less than 12% have achieved positions of leadership.

=== Wilderness myth ===
Historians have criticized the modern environmental movement for having romantic idealizations of wilderness. William Cronon writes "wilderness serves as the unexamined foundation on which so many of the quasi-religious values of modern environmentalism rest." Cronon claims that "to the extent that we live in an urban-industrial civilization but at the same time pretend to ourselves that our real home is in the wilderness, to just that extent we give ourselves permission to evade responsibility for the lives we actually lead."

Similarly Michael Pollan has argued that the wilderness ethic leads people to dismiss areas whose wildness is less than absolute. In his book Second Nature, Pollan writes that "once a landscape is no longer 'virgin' it is typically written off as fallen, lost to nature, irredeemable."

=== Debates within the movement ===
Within the environmental movement, an ideological debate has taken place between those with an ecocentric viewpoint and an anthropocentric viewpoint. The anthropocentric view has been seen as the conservationist approach to the environment with nature viewed, at least in part, as a resource to be used by man. In contrast to the conservationist approach the ecocentric view, associated with John Muir, Henry David Thoreau and William Wordsworth referred to as the preservationist movement. This approach sees nature in a more spiritual way. Many environmental historians consider the split between John Muir and Gifford Pinchot. During the preservation/conservation debate, the term preservationist becomes to be seen as a pejorative term.

While the ecocentric view focused on biodiversity and wilderness protection the anthropocentric view focuses on urban pollution and social justice. Some environmental writers, for example, William Cronon have criticized the ecocentric view as have a dualist view as a man being separate from nature. Critics of the anthropocentric viewpoint contend that the environmental movement has been taken over by so-called leftist with an agenda beyond environmental protection.

== Environmentalism and politics ==
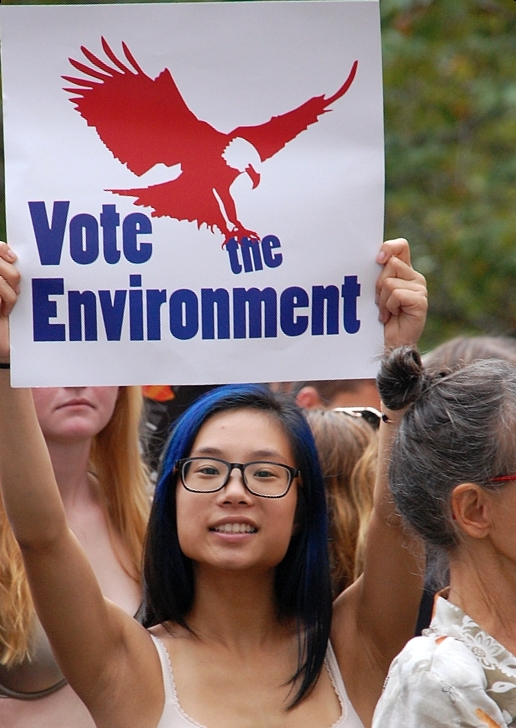
Demonstrator encouraging to vote for the environment

Environmentalists gained popularity in American politics after the creation or strengthening of numerous US environmental laws, including the Clean Air Act, Clean Water Act, and the formation of the United States Environmental Protection Agency (EPA) in 1970. These successes were followed by the enactment of a series of laws regulating waste including the Resource Conservation and Recovery Act; Toxic substances, (Toxic Substances Control Act); Pesticides (FIFRA: Federal Insecticide, Fungicide, and Rodenticide Act); clean-up of polluted sites (Superfund); protection of endangered species (Endangered Species Act).

Fewer environmental laws have been passed in the last decade as corporations and other conservative interests have increased their influence over American politics. Corporate cooperation against environmental lobbyists has been organized by the Wise Use group. At the same time, many environmentalists have been turning toward other means of persuasion, such as working with business, community, and other partners to promote sustainable development. Since the 1970s, coalitions and interests groups have directed themselves along the democrat and republican party lines.

Much environmental activism is directed towards conservation as well as the prevention or elimination of pollution. However, conservation movements; ecology movements; peace movements; green parties; green- and eco-anarchists often subscribe to very different ideologies, while supporting the same goals as those who call themselves "environmentalists". To outsiders, these groups or factions can appear to be indistinguishable.

As human population and industrial activity continue to increase, environmentalists often find themselves in serious conflict with those who believe that human and industrial activities should not be overly regulated or restricted, such as some libertarians.

Environmentalists often clash with others, particularly corporate interests, over issues of the management of natural resources, like in the case of the atmosphere as a "carbon dump", the focus of climate change, and global warming controversy. They usually seek to protect commonly owned or unowned resources for future generations.

== Environmental justice in the United States ==
Environmental justice (EJ) is a movement that began in the U.S. in the 1980s and aims to put a stop to environmental racism. (EJ) did not come into regular use until 1982 when Warren County, a predominantly African American community, became a site for toxic waste dumping. This sparked protests which eventually led to the arrest of 414 peaceful African American protestors. In 1987, the publication of the United Church of Christ (UCC) Commission for Racial Justice's report "Toxic Wastes and Race in the United States" offered the first clear description of environmental racism (ER). ER looks different in different communities, and each context requires distinct policies and actions. Closely related to ER, the environmental justice movement is also grassroots in practice and "importantly, a movement, which means that it starts and lives with the people".

Often, low-income and minority communities are located close to highways, garbage dumps, and factories. Because of this, these individuals were exposed to high concentrations of pollution, which increased their health risks from environmental harms.The Environmental Justice movement seeks to link "social" and "ecological" environmental concerns, while at the same time keeping environmentalists conscious of the dynamics in their own movement, i.e. racism, sexism, homophobia, classicism, and other malaises of the dominant culture.

In 1991, the First National People of Color Environmental Leadership Summit drafted the 17 principles of environmental justice calling for an "appreciation of our diverse cultural perspectives" along with the "ecological unity and the interdependence of all species, and the right to be free from ecological destruction". Throughout the EJ movement there has been a focus on everyone being safe from environmental harms including pollution, hazardous wastes, land access, and also the ability of all to participate in decision-making. Over time, the main principle that has developed within the movement is "We speak for ourselves" meaning those within the community experiencing the environmental injustice should be the leaders of change.

=== Major US environmental justice organizations ===
- Communities for a Better Environment: An organization founded in 1978 in San Francisco, California with the main mission of building power for low-income and communities of color to ultimately achieve environmental justice. They focus on reducing pollution and helping to create healthy, environmentally-friendly communities. In order to create action to tackle such an encompassing mission, CBE follows a threefold approach including community organizing, legal advocacy, and science. CBE, focuses on bringing marginalized communities together to create power and hence change in environmental decisions in their local areas. Volunteers from throughout the community come together to participate in door-knocking, community meetings, school groups, and various other educational opportunities. Today Communities for a Better Environment has expanded into Wisconsin and Minnesota.
- West Harlem Environmental Action: An organization founded in 1988 in New York city by community members foregrounding environmental racism within their community. West Harlem Environmental Action, now known as We Act, works on issues of climate justice, ensuring community-based participatory research, and participatory democracy are upheld within their organization and throughout the Harlem community. They mainly tackle issues of air regulation, pollution, and fair land use. Today, We Act has expanded to Washington, D.C.
- Indigenous Environmental Network: An organization founded in 1990 in North America with the main mission of uniting indigenous communities to protect "sacred sites, land, water, air, natural resources, health of both our people and all living things, and to build economically sustainable communities". IEN works with tribes to increase environmental education, organization, and in turn inspire action. IEN has expanded its reach globally, in recent years, providing global meetings to Indigenous communities on indigenous environmental issues.
- Climate Justice Alliance: An organization founded in 2013 in Detroit, Michigan with the main mission of uniting communities and organizations to following the just transition theory, versus the exploitative economic system in place. They place a strong emphasis on race, gender, and class in creating this transition. With creating this link between organizations and communities they hope to inspire action towards confronting climate change and the economy that creates it. Climate Justice Alliance focuses on making the transition within local communities to "clean community energy, regional food systems, zero waste, efficient, affordable, and durable housing, public transportation, ecosystem restoration and stewardship within scientific planetary boundaries". Climate Justice Alliance has currently expanded in Texas, Florida, Puerto Rico, and North Carolina.

=== Environmental rights ===
Many environmental lawsuits turn on the question of who has standing; are the legal issues limited to property owners, or does the general public have a right to intervene? Christopher D. Stone's 1972 essay, "Should trees have standing?" seriously addressed the question of whether natural objects themselves should have legal rights, including the right to participate in lawsuits. Stone suggested that there was nothing absurd in this view, and noted that many entities now regarded as having legal rights were, in the past, regarded as "things" that were regarded as legally rightless; for example, aliens, children and women. His essay is sometimes regarded as an example of the fallacy of hypostatization.

One of the earliest lawsuits to establish that citizens may sue for environmental and aesthetic harms was Scenic Hudson Preservation Conference v. Federal Power Commission, decided in 1965 by the Second Circuit Court of Appeals. The case helped halt the construction of a power plant on Storm King Mountain in New York State. See also United States environmental law and David Sive, an attorney who was involved in the case.

Conservation biology is an important and rapidly developing field. One way to avoid the stigma of an "ism" was to evolve early anti-nuclear groups into the more scientific Green Parties, sprout new NGOs such as Greenpeace and Earth Action, and devoted groups to protecting global biodiversity and preventing global warming and climate change. But in the process, much of the emotional appeal, and many of the original aesthetic goals were lost. Nonetheless, these groups have well-defined ethical and political views, backed by science.

=== Radical environmentalism ===
While most environmentalists are often mainstream and peaceful, other groups are more radical in their approach. Adherents of radical environmentalism and ecological anarchism are involved in direct action campaigns to protect the environment. Some campaigns have employed controversial tactics including sabotage, blockades, and arson, while most use peaceful protests such as marches, tree sitting, and the like. There is substantial debate within the environmental movement as to the acceptability of these tactics, but almost all environmentalists condemn violent actions that can harm humans.

==== Clashes by police ====
In 2023, for the first time in the history of the United States, the police killed an environmental activist during a protest. The protesters were camping in Atlanta's South River Forest, a natural area that the City of Atlanta and Police planned to raze in order to erect a police training facility to be called "Cop City." Police attacked protesters on 18 January 2023. One protester, Tortuguita or, Manuel Esteban Páez Terán was killed and seven more were arrested.

== In popular culture ==
- The U.S. Forest Service created Smokey the Bear in 1944; he appeared in countless posters, radio and television programs, movies, press releases, and other guises to warn about forest fires.
- The comic strip Mark Trail, by environmentalist Ed Dodd, began in 1946; it still appears weekly in 175 newspapers.
- The children's animated show Captain Planet and the Planeteers, created by Ted Turner and Barbara Pyle in 1989 to inform children about environmental issues. The show aired for six seasons and 113 episodes, in 100 countries worldwide from 1990 to 1996.
- In 1974, Spokane, Washington, became one of the smallest cities ever to host a World's Fair. From Saturday, 4 May, to Sunday, 3 November 1974, Spokane hosted Expo 74, the first world's fair to focus on the environment. The theme of Expo 74 was "Celebrating Tomorrow's Fresh New Environment." (In 1982, Knoxville, Tennessee, was another small city to host a world's fair: Expo '82, with the theme, "Energy Turns the World.")
- FernGully: The Last Rainforest is an animated motion picture released in 1992, which focuses exclusively on the environment. The movie is based on a book under the same title by Diana Young. In 1998, a sequel, FernGully 2: The Magical Rescue, was introduced.

== See also ==
- History of the environmental movement in the United States
- Earth Days, a 2009 documentary feature film about the start of the environmental movement in the United States.
- Environmentalism (Critique of George W. Bush's politics)
- Environmental issues in the United States
- Environmental racism
- Grassroots environmental activism in the United States–Mexico borderlands
- List of American non-fiction environmental writers
- List of anti-nuclear protests in the United States
- Metal roof
- Sex ecology
