= Overhoff Technology =

US company specializing in radiation monitoring equipment

- Industry: Nuclear industry nonitoring equipment
- Founded: 1972 in Cincinnati
- Founder: Mario Overhoff
- Fate: Acquired by US Nuclear Corp
- Headquarters: Milford, Ohio, United States
- Key people: Robert Goldstein (CEO)
- Products: Tritium and radon monitors
- Parent: US Nuclear Corp
- Website: www.overhoff.com

Overhoff Technology Corp is a subsidiary of US Nuclear Corp, (OTC BB: UCLE). Founded in 1972, it is based in Milford, Ohio, and designs, constructs, and sells radiation monitoring equipment.

== History ==
Overhoff Technology Corporation was founded in 1972 by Mario Overhoff (1928-2005) in Cincinnati. It was originally named Overhoff and Associates.

In 2007, the company was bought by Robert Goldstein, CEO of the company Technical Associates (Optron Scientific Corp).

In 2010, Overhoff partnered with Locus Technologies on tritium monitoring for the nuclear industry.

As of 2015, Overhoff Technology Corp. remained a subsidiary of US Nuclear Corp. In February 2015, US Nuclear was cleared to become publicly traded by FINRA under the symbol UCLE. It trades on the Over-the-Counter Bulletin Board. As of 2020, the company was listed as having been awarded contracts by the United States Department of Defense.

In February 2025, US Nuclear Corp announced it was consolidating its Optron facilities in Los Angeles and its Overhoff Technology facility in Milford, Ohio.

== Products ==
Their product line includes tritium monitors, with monitors for detecting tritium surface contamination, as well as levels in air, water, and seawater. It also makes products such as a radon air monitor. According to the company, the monitors are used in nuclear power plants, nuclear research facilities, pharmaceutical laboratories, industrial manufacturing, and in military and government applications. Overhoff Technology's products are ISO 9001 certified.

== See also ==
- List of companies in the nuclear sector
