= List of companies in the nuclear sector =

This is a list of large companies in the nuclear power industry that are active along the nuclear chain, from uranium mining, processing and enrichment, to the actual operating of nuclear power plant and nuclear waste processing. There are many other companies that provide nuclear technologies such as nuclear medicine that are independent of the electrical power generation sector.

Company	Country of origin	Field of operation	Brief description of business
BHP	Australia	Uranium mining	Owner and operator of the Olympic Dam underground copper and uranium mine in South Australia.
Energy Resources of Australia	Australia	Uranium mining	Energy Resources of Australia, a subsidiary of Rio Tinto, is an Australian uranium mining company and one of the largest uranium producers in the world, providing 11% of the world's uranium production. It operated the Ranger Uranium Mine until it ceased operation in January 2021.
Heathgate Resources	Australia	Uranium mining	Wholly owned subsidiary of General Atomics. Operators of Beverley in-situ leach (ISL) uranium mine in South Australia.
Paladin Energy	Australia	Uranium mining	Paladin Energy is an Australian mining company developing a number of uranium projects in Australia and Africa.
Electrabel	Belgium	Electricity generation	Electrabel, a subsidiary of Engie, owns and operates Doel and Tihange nuclear power plants. Its wholly owned subsidiary Synatom deals with fuel supply and spent fuel management.
Eletronuclear	Brazil	Electricity generation	Eletronuclear, a wholly owned subsidiary of Eletrobrás, operates Angra Nuclear Power Plant.
Bulgarian Energy Holding	Bulgaria	Electricity generation	Bulgarian Energy Holding, through its subsidiary of Kozloduy NPP, owns and operates Kozloduy Nuclear Power Plant.
Cameco	Canada	Uranium mining, nuclear fuel	Cameco is a Canadian mining company accounting for 19% of world uranium production. Cameco owns and operates mines in Canada and the United States and holds land positions in areas for new uranium discoveries in Canada and Australia. In addition to mining, Cameco is also active in the refining and conversion of uranium, and in fuel manufacturing.
Hathor Exploration	Canada	Uranium mining	Hathor Exploration, a subsidiary of Rio Tinto, is a Canadian uranium mining company. Its main assets are the Midwest NorthEast Project and the Roughrider Deposit.
Uranium One	Canada	Uranium mining	Uranium One, a subsidiary of ARMZ Uranium Holding, is a Canadian uranium producer with interests in the uranium mines in Kazakhstan, United States, and South Africa.
Bruce Power	Canada	Electricity generation	Bruce Power is a partnership among Cameco Corporation, TransCanada Corporation, and BPC Generation Infrastructure Trust operating the Bruce Nuclear Generating Station.
New Brunswick Power	Canada	Electricity generation	New Brunswick Power operates the Point Lepreau Nuclear Generating Station.
Ontario Power Generation	Canada	Electricity generation	Ontario Power Generation, wholly owned by the Province of Ontario, operates the Pickering Nuclear Generating Station and Darlington Nuclear Generating Station. In addition, it also owns the Bruce Nuclear Generating Station leased on a long-term basis to Bruce Power.
Denison Mines	Canada	Uranium mining	Denison Mines is a Canadian intermediate uranium producer operating five uranium mines in the United States and two in Canada, with exploration projects in Canada, the United States, Mongolia, and indirectly in Australia. Through its 97% ownership in OmegaCorp Limited, an Australian uranium mining company, Denison is also involved in the exploration of the Kariba Uranium Project in Zambia. 15% of Denison Mines is owned by Korea Electric Power Corporation.
China General Nuclear Power Group	China	Electricity generation	China General Nuclear Power Group is the Chinese state-owned nuclear power company which owns the Guangdong Daya Bay Nuclear Power Station and Ling Ao Nuclear Power Station and is building the Hongyanhe Nuclear Power Plant, Yangjiang Nuclear Power Station and Ningde Nuclear Power Station.
China National Nuclear Corporation	China	Holding	China National Nuclear Corporation is a Chinese state-owned energy company, composed of over 100 subsidiary companies and institutes. CNNC is for 45% owner of China Guangdong Nuclear Power Group.
China Nuclear International Uranium Corporation	China	Uranium mining	China Nuclear International Uranium Corporation (SinoU) is the Chinese state-owned company involved in the overseas uranium mining .
Škoda Works	Czech Republic	Engineering, procurement and construction, nuclear engineering, nuclear fuel cycle	Škoda Praha, a subsidiary of United Heavy Machinery, is a nuclear engineering company, the main contractor for the technological part of the construction of the Temelín Nuclear Power Station and the Mochovce Nuclear Power Plant.
ČEZ Group	Czech Republic	Electricity generation	ČEZ Group operates the Temelín Nuclear Power Station and Dukovany Nuclear Power Station.
Fortum	Finland	Electricity generation	Fortum is an operator of the Loviisa Nuclear Power Plant. It has minority stakes in the Olkiluoto Nuclear Power Plant in Finland and the Forsmark Nuclear Power Plant in Sweden.
Fennovoima	Finland	Electricity generation	Fennovoima was the developer of the Hanhikivi 1 nuclear power plant project at Pyhäjoki. The company cancelled the project and terminated its contract with Rosatom in May 2022.
Teollisuuden Voima	Finland	Electricity generation	Teollisuuden Voima Oyj is an operator of the Olkiluoto Nuclear Power Plant.
Eurodif	France	Uranium enrichment	Eurodif, a subsidiary of Areva, is an operator of the uranium enrichment plant at the Tricastin Nuclear Power Center.
Framatome	France	Uranium mining, nuclear fuel cycle, nuclear engineering, engineering, procurement and construction.	Framatome is a French nuclear energy group with manufacturing facilities in 58 countries. It covers all industrial activities of nuclear energy.
Franco-Belge de Fabrication du Combustible	France / Belgium	Nuclear fuel	Franco-Belge de Fabrication du Combustible, a subsidiary of Areva, is a nuclear fuel producing company located in Romans-sur-Isère in France and Dessel in Belgium.
Bouygues Construction	France	Engineering, procurement and construction	Bouygues Construction, a part of the French family-owned Bouygues group, mainly builds ports, roads, bridges, tunnels, dams and other public constructions, but has also been involved in building, maintaining and dismantling nuclear power plants.
EDF	France	Electricity generation	The EDF Group is a power generation company which operates 58 reactors in 19 different sites. In addition, it has a 45% stake in EnBW, and has a 30% stake in the Taishan Nuclear Power Plant. Its subsidiary EDF Energy Nuclear Generation Limited owns and operates eight plants in the United Kingdom.
PreussenElektra GmbH	Germany	Electricity generation	PreussenElektra GmbH is a subsidiary of E.ON that operated and is now decommissioning the Brokdorf, Grohnde, Isar 2 and Unterweser nuclear power plants.
EnBW	Germany	Electricity generation	EnBW, a subsidiary of EDF, through its subsidiary EnBW Kernkraft GmbH operated the now decommissioned Philippsburg Nuclear Power Plant, Obrigheim Nuclear Power Plant, and Neckarwestheim Nuclear Power Plant.
Nukem Energy	Germany	Nuclear fuel cycle	Nukem Energy GmbH, a subsidiary of Cameco, together with its subsidiary Nukem, markets nuclear (reprocessed) fuel components and speciality products.
Nukem Technologies	Germany	Nuclear waste management; engineering, procurement and construction	Nukem Technologies GmbH, a subsidiary of Atomstroyexport, is a nuclear engineering and consulting company managing radioactive waste and spent fuel, and decommissioning of nuclear facilities.
GNS Gesellschaft für Nuklear-Service	Germany	Nuclear waste management; engineering, procurement and construction	GNS Gesellschaft für Nuklear-Service mbH carries out services in the field of radioactive waste disposal and decommissioning of nuclear facilities. Its subsidiary Deutsche Gesellschaft zum Bau und Betrieb von Endlagern für Abfallstoffe is building and operating nuclear waste repositories.
Rheinmetall Defence	Germany	Simulation	Offers nuclear power plant operation simulation and training.
RWE	Germany	Electricity generation	RWE AG operated the Biblis Nuclear Power Plant, Lingen Nuclear Power Plant and Gundremmingen Nuclear Power Plant.
Siemens	Germany	Nuclear engineering, engineering, procurement and construction	Siemens Energy develops and builds power plants and power-generating components. It refurbishes and upgrades turbine-generator units, including those used in the nuclear power plants.
Bhavini	India	Nuclear development	Bhavini is a public sector enterprise responsible for the construction, commissioning and operation of all Stage II fast breeder reactors.
Nuclear Power Corporation of India	India	Electricity generation	Nuclear Power Corporation of India Limited is a public sector enterprise generating about 3% of the total electricity production in India. It operates Tarapur Atomic Power Station, Rajasthan Atomic Power Station, Madras Atomic Power Station, Narora Atomic Power Station, Kakrapar Atomic Power Station, Kaiga Atomic Power Station, and Kudankulam Nuclear Power Plant.
Uranium Corporation of India	India	Uranium mining	Uranium Corporation of India is a public sector enterprise involved in the mining and processing of uranium.
Nuclear Fuel Complex	India	Nuclear fuel	Uranium Corporation of India is a public sector enterprise involved in nuclear fuel production.
Heavy Water Board	India	Heavy water production	Uranium Corporation of India is a public sector enterprise involved in the production of heavy water.
National Thermal Power Corporation	India	Electricity generation	The National Thermal Power Corporation has established a joint venture with the Nuclear Power Corporation of India for the construction of nuclear power plants.
Larsen & Toubro (L&T)	India	Manufacturing of equipment of nuclear power plants	L&T is one of largest engineering companies of India, engaged in building parts of nuclear plants.
AzarAb Industries	Iran	Engineering, procurement and construction	AzarAb Industries constructs nuclear power plants and manufactures nuclear power plant equipment.
Ansaldo Nucleare	Italy	Nuclear engineering	Ansaldo Nucleare, a subsidiary of Ansaldo Energia, a part of the Finmeccanica-Group, and works on engineering, construction, operations assistance, waste management and decommissioning projects at nuclear plants worldwide.
Enel	Italy	Electricity generation	Enel has nuclear activities in Russia (no operating projects yet), France (a 12.5% stake in the Unit 3 of Flamanville Nuclear Power Plant), Slovakia (66% stake in Slovenské elektrárne), Spain (92% stake in Endesa) and Italy (a joint venture with Edf named Sviluppo Nucleare Italia Srl).
Electric Power Development Company	Japan	Electricity generation	Electric Power Development Co., Ltd. (J-Power) is constructing the Ōma Nuclear Power Plant.
Tokyo Electric Power Company	Japan	Electricity generation	Tokyo Electric Power Company, (TEPCO) is the largest nuclear operator in Japan. It operates the Fukushima Daiichi Nuclear Power Plant, Fukushima Daini Nuclear Power Plant, and Kashiwazaki–Kariwa Nuclear Power Plant.
Kansai Electric Power Company	Japan	Electricity generation	Kansai Electric Power Company, supplies electric power to the Kansai region, and operates the Mihama Nuclear Power Plant, Takahama Nuclear Power Plant, and the Ōi Nuclear Power Plant. About 41% of its electricity is generated from nuclear.
Japan Nuclear Fuel Limited	Japan	Nuclear fuel cycle	Japan Nuclear Fuel Limited is involved in the production of nuclear fuel, as well as the reprocessing, storage and disposal of nuclear waste.
Kazatomprom	Kazakhstan	Nuclear holding	Kazatomprom is a state-owned nuclear holding company in Kazakhstan. Kazatomprom controls all uranium exploration and mining as well as other nuclear-related activities, including imports and exports of nuclear materials in the country. The company accounts for 10% of the world uranium production. It owns a 10% stake in Westinghouse Electric Company.
Korea Hydro & Nuclear Power	Korea	Electricity generation	Korea Hydro & Nuclear Power (KHNP), a subsidiary of the Korea Electric Power Corporation, operates 20 nuclear power units at the Kori Nuclear Power Plant, Yeonggwang Nuclear Power Plant, Uljin Nuclear Power Plant, and Wolseong Nuclear Power Plant. In December 2009, KHNP started cooperating with Areva on the development of uranium mining in Niger.
Korea Nuclear Fuel	Korea	Nuclear fuel	Korea Nuclear Fuel, a subsidiary of the Korea Electric Power Corporation, is a manufacturer of nuclear fuels.
KEPCO E&C	Korea	Engineering, procurement and construction	KEPCO E&C, a subsidiary of the Korea Electric Power Corporation, is a nuclear power design, engineering, and constructing company.
Rössing	Namibia	Uranium mining	Rössing, a subsidiary of Rio Tinto, is an operator of the Rössing uranium mine in Namibia.
Essent	Netherlands	Electricity generation	Essent, a subsidiary of RWE, together with DELTA owns 50% of the Borssele Nuclear Power Station in the Netherlands.
Nuclearelectrica	Romania	Electricity generation	The state-owned Societatea Nationala Nuclearelectrica operates the Cernavodă Nuclear Power Plant.
Atomstroyexport	Russia	Nuclear reactor engineering, engineering, procurement and construction	Atomstroyexport, a subsidiary of Rosatom, is a nuclear technology provider and constructor for overseas projects.
Inter RAO	Russia	Electricity generation	Inter RAO UES, minority shares owned by Rosatom, operates the Metsamor Nuclear Power Plant in Armenia and is building the Kaliningrad Nuclear Power Plant.
Atommash	Russia	Nuclear engineering	Atommash is a manufacturer of components for nuclear power plants.
United Heavy Machinery	Russia	Nuclear engineering	United Heavy Machinery is a provider of primary circuit equipment for nuclear power plants with pressurized water reactors. Its subsidiary Izhora Plants produces forgings for nuclear reactors.
FSUE Atomflot	Russia	Nuclear fleet service	FSUE Atomflot maintains the world's only fleet of nuclear-powered icebreakers.
Atomenergoprom	Russia	Nuclear holding	Atomenergoprom, a subsidiary of Rosatom, is a holding company for Russian civil nuclear industry.
NuScale Power	United States	Nuclear engineering	NuScale is a manufacturer and systems engineering company for small modular nuclear reactors.
Rosenergoatom	Russia	Electricity generation	Rosenergoatom, a subsidiary of Rosatom, is an operator of all Russian civil nuclear power plants.
Atomenergomash	Russia	Nuclear engineering	Atomenergomash, a subsidiary of Rosatom, is a manufacturer of nuclear power plants' components.
ARMZ Uranium Holding	Russia	Uranium mining	ARMZ Uranium Holding, a subsidiary of Rosatom, is a uranium mining company.
Rosatom	Russia	Nuclear holding	Rosatom Nuclear Energy State Corporation is the successor of the Russian ministry of the nuclear complex. It is a state-owned holding company for the all Russian nuclear sector, including nuclear power related companies, nuclear weapons companies, research institutes and nuclear and radiation safety agencies. It also represents Russia in the world in the field of peaceful use of nuclear energy and protection of the nonproliferation regime.
Tekhsnabexport	Russia	Nuclear fuel cycle	Tekhsnabexport (Tenex), a subsidiary of Rosatom, is a provider of nuclear fuel cycle products and services.
TVEL	Russia	Nuclear fuel cycle	TVEL's activities include development, fabrication and sales (including export sales) of nuclear fuel. TVEL, a subsidiary of Rosatom, consists of 14 enterprises, including mining enterprises, major production entities and supporting infrastructure companies.
OKBM Afrikantov	Russia	Nuclear engineering	OKBM Afrikantov, a subsidiary of Rosatom, is a nuclear reactor design and engineering company.
OKB Gidropress	Russia	Nuclear engineering	OKB Gidropress, a subsidiary of Rosatom, is a nuclear reactor design and engineering company.
Slovenske Elektrarne	Slovakia	Electricity generation	Slovenske Elektrarne, a subsidiary of Enel, is an operator of the Bohunice Nuclear Power Plant and Mochovce Nuclear Power Plant.
GEN Energija	Slovenia	Electricity generation	GEN Energija, a state-owned company, is a co-owner of the Krško Nuclear Power Plant.
Eskom	South Africa	Electricity generation	Eskom operates the Koeberg Nuclear Power Station.
Endesa	Spain	Electricity generation	Endesa owns Unit 1 of Ascó Nuclear Power Plant and has stakes in Unit 2 of Ascó Nuclear Power Plant (85%), Almaraz Nuclear Power Plant (36%), Santa María de Garoña Nuclear Power Plant (50%), Vandellòs Nuclear Power Plant (72%), and Trillo Nuclear Power Plant (1%).
Iberdrola	Spain	Electricity generation, EPC	The Iberdrola Group has a total installed nuclear capacity of 3,344 MW. It has stakes in the Santa María de Garoña Nuclear Power Plant (50%), Trillo Nuclear Power Plant (49%), Almaraz Nuclear Power Plant (52%), Unit 2 of Ascó Nuclear Power Plant (15%), Cofrentes Nuclear Power Plant (100%), and Vandellòs Nuclear Power Plant (28%). Its subsidiary Iberdrola Ingeniería y Construcción provides engineering, procurement and construction services in France, Russia, Slovakia, Mexico, Brazil, Sweden, Ukraine and Bulgaria.
Sydkraft Nuclear	Sweden	Electricity generation	Sydkraft Nuclear, a subsidiary of Sydkraft which is a part of the Uniper Group, has stakes in the Forsmark Nuclear Power Plant, Ringhals Nuclear Power Plant, and Oskarshamn Nuclear Power Plant in Sweden.
OKG AB	Sweden	Electricity generation	OKG, controlled by Sydkraft Nuclear and Fortum, is an operator of the Oskarshamn Nuclear Power Plant.
Vattenfall	Sweden	Electricity generation	Vattenfall has stakes in the Ringhals Nuclear Power Plant and Forsmark Nuclear Power Plant in Sweden, and the Brokdorf Nuclear Power Plant, Brunsbüttel Nuclear Power Plant, and Krümmel Nuclear Power Plant in Germany.
Resun AG	Switzerland	Electricity generation	Resun AG, owned by BKW FMB Energie AG (31.25%) and the Axpo subsidiaries Nordostschweizerische Kraftwerke AG (57.75%) and Centralschweizerische Kraftwerke AG (11%), plans to build replacement plants for the Mühleberg Nuclear Power Plant and Beznau Nuclear Power Plant.
BKW FMB Energie	Switzerland	Electricity generation	BKW FMB Energy is the owner of the Mühleberg Nuclear Power Plant and has a stake in the Leibstadt Nuclear Power Plant.
Alpiq	Switzerland	Electricity generation	Alpiq has interest in the Gösgen Nuclear Power Plant (40%) and Leibstadt Nuclear Power Plant (32%). It plans to build the Niederamt Nuclear Power Plant.
BHP	UK / Australia	Uranium mining	BHP is the world's largest mining company. It owns the Olympic Dam mine, a multi-mineral ore body, which is the largest uranium deposit.
Urenco Group	UK / Germany / Netherlands	Nuclear fuel cycle	Urenco operates in a pivotal area of the nuclear fuel supply chain, including mining, conversion, enrichment and fabrication. It owns and operates enrichment plants in the UK (Capenhurst), Germany (Gronau) and the Netherlands (Almelo). In the US, Urenco owns the National Enrichment Facility in New Mexico. Urenco also owns a 50% interest in Enrichment Technology Company Limited, a joint venture with Areva.
Horizon Nuclear Power	United Kingdom	Electricity generation	Horizon Nuclear Power was established to develop new nuclear power stations at the Wylfa Nuclear Power Station and Oldbury Nuclear Power Station sites. Its parent company, Hitachi, suspended the development programme in 2019 and formally withdrew from the project in September 2020.
Magnox Ltd	United Kingdom	Nuclear decommissioning	Magnox Ltd. is responsible for the operation and decommissioning of Magnox nuclear power stations in the United Kingdom.
Sellafield Ltd	United Kingdom	Nuclear decommissioning	Sellafield Ltd. is responsible for the decommissioning of the Sellafield nuclear facility in the United Kingdom.
Energoatom	Ukraine	Electricity generation	Energoatom is a state-owned operator of all nuclear power plants in Ukraine.
Atlas Atomics	United States	Nuclear reactor development	Atlas Atomics is developing advanced heavy-water reactor technology for baseload power, the production of medical and industrial isotopes, and the recycling of spent nuclear fuel.
EnergySolutions	United States	Low Level nuclear waste disposal	EnergySolutions is the largest nuclear waste company in the United States.
Fluke Corporation	United States	Radiation Monitoring Systems	Victoreen specializes in radiation detection equipment. Founded in 1928 by John Austin Victoreen, Victoreen was the only maker of nuclear instruments until 1946. Victoreen's early contract to build instruments was to support the development of the first atomic bomb as part of the Manhattan Project. After the end of WWII, Victoreen was the major supplier of instruments for the first atomic tests in the Marshall Islands in 1946 for the Able, Baker and Charlie tests. Victoreen provided 95% of the instrumentation for the South Pacific atomic bomb tests and became known as the “First Nuclear Company”. Today Victoreen has equipment installed in hundreds of facilities and nuclear power plants across the world.
Dominion Resources	United States	Electricity generation	Dominion Resources through its three daughter companies operates the Kewaunee Power Station (556 MW, north eastern Wisconsin), Millstone Nuclear Power Plant (2,103 MW, Connecticut), North Anna Nuclear Generating Station (1,806 MW) and Surry Nuclear Power Plant (1,598 MW).
Duke Energy	United States	Electricity generation	Duke Energy operates the Catawba Nuclear Station, Oconee Nuclear Station, and McGuire Nuclear Station. It plans to build the William States Lee III Nuclear Generating Station.
GE Vernova Hitachi Nuclear Energy	United States/Japan	Nuclear reactor engineering; Engineering, procurement and construction; Nuclear fuel	GE Vernova Hitachi Nuclear Energy, a partnership of GE Vernova and Hitachi (in Japan the partnership is Hitachi-GE Nuclear Energy), is a provider of advanced reactor technology and nuclear services, including manufacturing nuclear fuel and uranium enrichment services.
NRG Energy	United States	Electricity generation	NRG Energy is an operator of the South Texas Nuclear Generating Station. Together with Toshiba it develops additional units at the plant.
South Carolina Electric and Gas Company	United States	Electricity generation	South Carolina Electric and Gas Company (SCE&G), a subsidiary of SCANA Corporation, is an operator of the Virgil C. Summer Nuclear Generating Station
Southern Company	United States	Electricity generation	Southern Company through its subsidiaries Alabama Power and Georgia Power operates the Joseph M. Farley Nuclear Generating Station, Edwin I. Hatch Nuclear Power Plant, and the Vogtle Electric Generating Plant.
UniStar Nuclear Energy	United States	Electricity generation	UniStar Nuclear Energy, a joint venture of EDF and Constellation, is a developer of new units at the Calvert Cliffs Nuclear Power Plant, Nine Mile Point Nuclear Generating Station, Callaway Nuclear Generating Station, and the Bell Bend Nuclear Power Plant.
Westinghouse Electric Company	United States	Nuclear fuel cycle, nuclear engineering, engineering, procurement and construction	Westinghouse Electric, offers nuclear fuel, services, technology, plant design and equipment.
Constellation	United States	Electricity generation	Constellation Energy Nuclear Group, a joint venture of Constellation and EDF, is an operator of the Calvert Cliffs Nuclear Power Plant, Robert Emmett Ginna Nuclear Power Plant, and Nine Mile Point Nuclear Generating Station.
Nuclear Fuel Services	United States	Nuclear fuel	Nuclear Fuel Services is a nuclear fuel manufacturer.
Sequoyah Fuels Corporation	United States	Nuclear fuel	Sequoyah Fuels Corporation, a subsidiary of General Atomics, is a uranium processing company in the United States.
Centrus Energy Corp.	United States	Uranium enrichment	Formerly known as the United States Enrichment Corporation, the company emerged from bankruptcy restructuring in 2014 as Centrus Energy Corp. It supplies enriched uranium fuel and develops advanced centrifuge enrichment technologies.
United Nuclear Corporation	United States	Nuclear fuel cycle,	United Nuclear Corporation is a former American Nuclear company.
US Nuclear Corp	United States	Radiation Detection, Tritium Equipment	US Nuclear Corp. is a radiation detection company specializing in advanced tritium detection monitors through its Overhoff Technology division and radiation detection devices from its Technical Associates (Optron Scientific Corp) division in the United States.

== Others ==
Other notable nuclear power groups (some mixed energy) include:

Name	Country
American Nuclear Society	United States
Atomic Energy Commission of India	India
Atomic Energy of Canada Limited	Canada
British Energy	United Kingdom
Canadian Nuclear Safety Commission	Canada
Egyptian Atomic Energy Authority	Egypt
Électricité de France	France
Environmentalists for Nuclear Energy	France
Environmentalists for Nuclear Energy Australia	Australia
EURATOM	Europe
Federal Atomic Energy Agency	Russia
Institute of Nuclear Power Operations	United States
International Atomic Energy Agency (IAEA)	International (headquarters in Vienna, Austria)
National Atomic Energy Commission (CNEA)	Argentina
Nuclear Energy Corporation of South Africa (NECSA)	South Africa
Nuclear Energy Institute	United States
Nuclear Industry Association	United Kingdom
Pakistan Atomic Energy Commission	Pakistan
Pakistan Nuclear Society	Pakistan
Russian Federal Atomic Energy Agency	Russia
United Kingdom Atomic Energy Authority	United Kingdom
United States Department of Energy	United States
World Nuclear Association (WNA)	International

== See also ==
- Nuclear power by country
- Category:Nuclear industry organizations
- List of anti-nuclear power groups
- List of small modular reactor designs
