= Musicians United for Safe Energy =

American anti-nuclear activist group

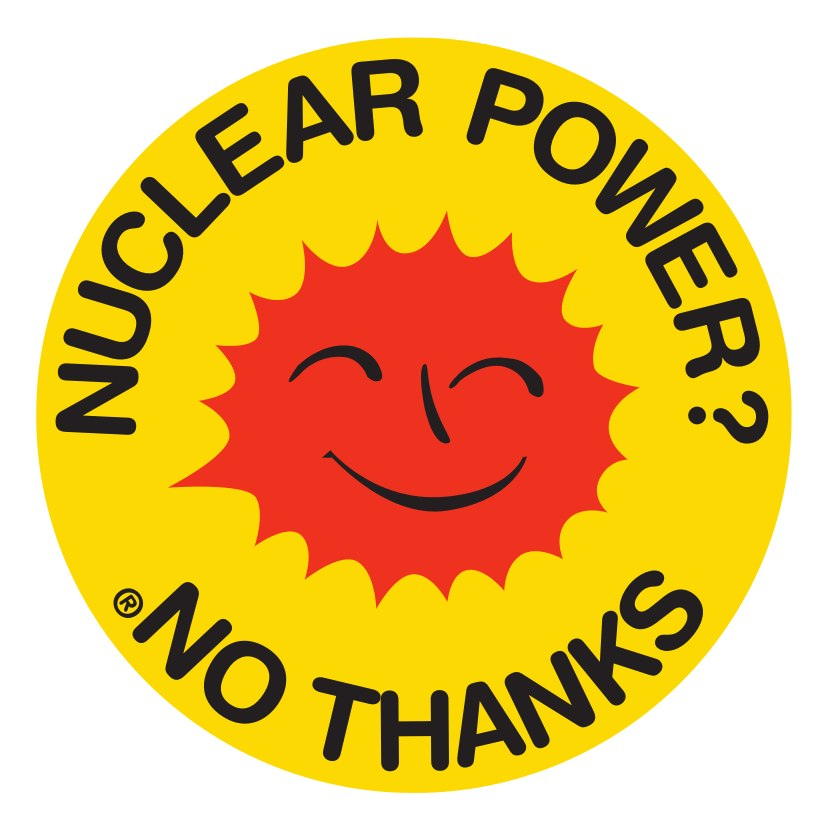
Smiling Sun Logo

Musicians United for Safe Energy, or MUSE, is an activist group founded in 1979 by Jackson Browne, Graham Nash, Bonnie Raitt, Harvey Wasserman and John Hall. The group advocates against the use of nuclear energy, forming shortly after the Three Mile Island nuclear accident in March 1979. MUSE organized a series of five No Nukes concerts held at Madison Square Garden in New York in September 1979. On September 23, 1979, almost 200,000 people attended a large rally staged by MUSE on the then-empty north end of the Battery Park City landfill in New York.

Other musicians performing at the concerts included Crosby, Stills and Nash, Bruce Springsteen and the E Street Band, James Taylor, Carly Simon, Chaka Khan, the Doobie Brothers, Jesse Colin Young, Gil Scott-Heron, Tom Petty, Dan Fogelberg, Poco and others. The album No Nukes, and a film, also titled No Nukes, were both released in 1980 to document the performances. A full No Nukes concert featuring Browne and Crosby, Stills & Nash was also filmed near the beach in Ventura, California, at the Ventura County Fairgrounds, but none of that footage made it into the final cut.

A controversy sparked after the performance of Jamaican reggae singer Peter Tosh wearing Palestinian clothing (thawb and keffiyeh) and openly smoking marijuana. Tosh's appearance was considered a provocation towards the Jewish community in New York City, as the concerts took place during the New Year holiday. Despite his performance being advertised to appear in the accompanying film and on the triple live album, Tosh was removed from both releases.

In the 2006 midterm elections, Hall was elected to the United States House of Representatives from New York's 19th congressional district, on a platform that included intensive investment in alternative energy. He defeated the incumbent, Sue Kelly.

In 2007, Raitt, Nash, and Browne, as part of the No Nukes group, recorded a music video of the Buffalo Springfield song "For What It's Worth".

Thirty two years after the No Nukes concert in New York, on August 7, 2011, a MUSE benefit concert was held at Shoreline Amphitheater in Mountain View, CA. to raise money for MUSE and for Japanese tsunami/nuclear disaster relief. Artists included Jackson Browne, Bonnie Raitt, John Hall, Graham Nash, David Crosby, Stephen Stills, Kitaro, Jason Mraz, Sweet Honey in the Rock, the Doobie Brothers, Tom Morello, and Jonathan Wilson. The show was powered off-grid.

== See also ==
- Alliance for Nuclear Responsibility
- Anti-nuclear movement in the United States
- Abalone Alliance
- Shad Alliance
- Anti-nuclear protests in the United States
- Great Peace March for Global Nuclear Disarmament
- Mothers for Peace
- Clamshell Alliance
