= Santa María de Garoña Nuclear Power Plant =

Former Spanish nuclear power station

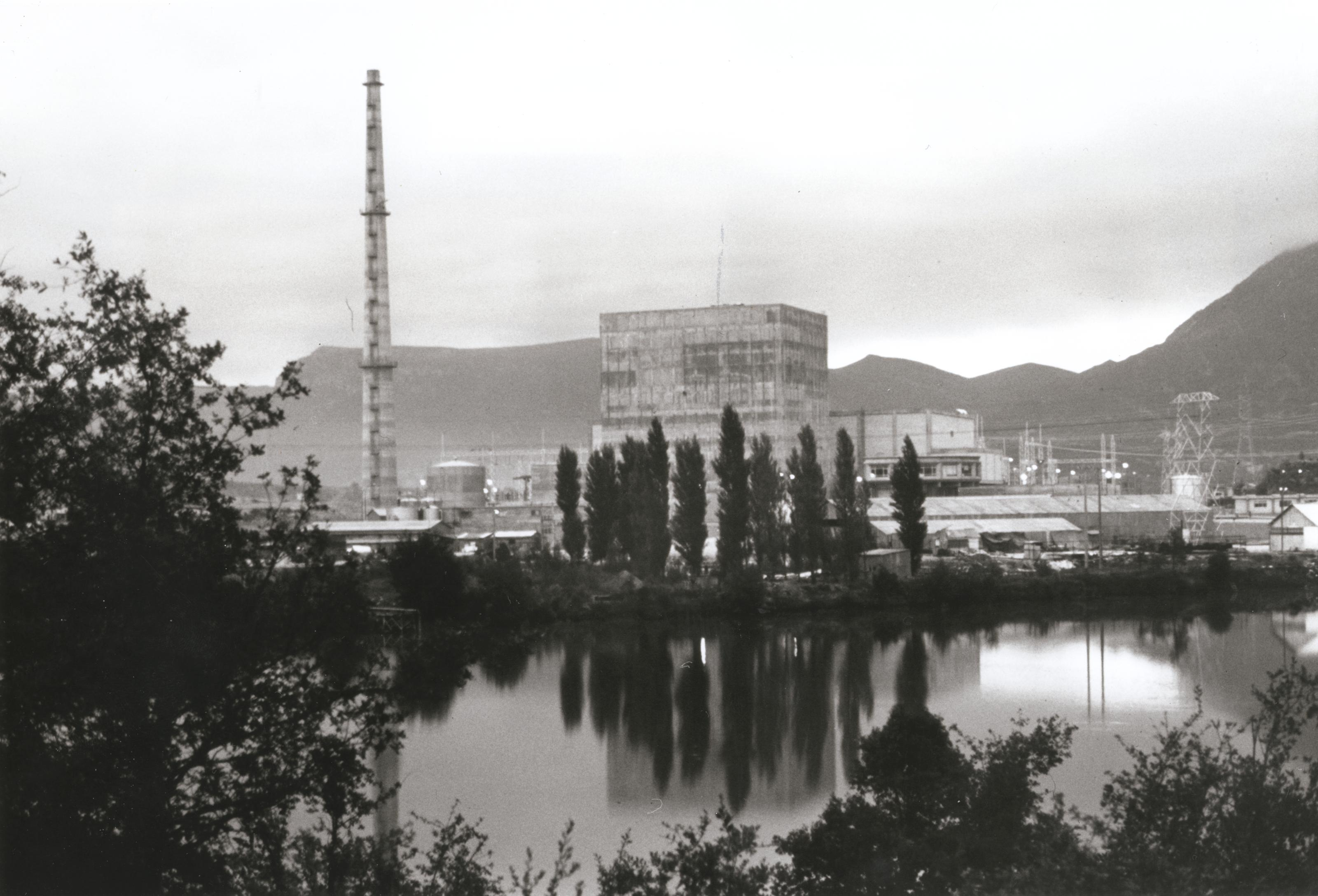
- Santa María de Garoña Nuclear Power Plant
- Country: Spain
- Coordinates: 42°46′31.08″N 3°12′26.25″W
- Status: Mothballed
- Construction began: September 1, 1966
- Commission date: May 11, 1971
- Decommission date: August 2017
- Owner: Nuclenor
- Operators: Nuclenor S.A. (Iberdrola and Endesa)

Nuclear power station
- Reactor type: BWR
- Reactor supplier: General Electric

Power generation
- Units decommissioned: 1 × 466 MW
- Nameplate capacity: 466 MW

External links
- Commons: Related media on Commons

Santa María de Garoña Nuclear Power Plant is a mothballed nuclear power station at Santa María de Garoña, Burgos (Spain). It consists of one boiling water reactor (BWR) of 466 megawatts (MWe).

The reactor vessel was built in 1966 by the Dutch RDM., being the oldest Spanish Nuclear Power Plant in service. The reactor is a BWR/3 model with a Mark I containment building.

The plant was opened in 1971 and officially closed on 5 July 2013. Nuclenor, the plant's operator, had sought a ten-year extension, which was supported by Spain's Nuclear Safety Council (Consejo de Seguridad Nuclear, CSN) despite Spain's policy of phasing out nuclear power. On 2 July 2009, the Ministry of Industry, Tourism and Trade compromised, extending the operating license for an additional four years subject to safety upgrades, though this extension was never used.

On December 16, 2012, the plant operator Nuclenor has begun shutting down the nuclear power plant, which was due to close in mid-2013, to avoid producing taxable power during 2013. The decision was spurred by an impending law, which would impose a tax in the annual sum of about €150 million. The safety upgrades required for extension of the operation would have cost some €120 million.

In May 2014, following a change in national law allowing mothballed nuclear power stations restart, Nuclenor submitted a request to renew the operating licence, allowing to operate the plant until 2 March 2031.

In July 2014, Nuclenor was fined €18.4 million by the Spanish National Commission on Financial Markets and Competition (CNMC), for having shut down the reactor in December 2012, months before its operational licence was due to expire on 6 July 2013.

In February 2017, Spain's nuclear safety regulator gave conditional approval for the restart and continued operation of the Garoña nuclear power plant, but the operator would be required to make a number of safety upgrades.

However, new concerns on security raised later, in May 2017, as a result of a complaint about the working conditions in a waste store, which was received by the inspection just two days after the approval of the nuclear regulator to the extension of the plant. The waste deposit holds 2,800 radioactive drums that need reprocessing and some of them "have lost integrity and the residue is dispersed inside the silo", according to the CSN. After complaints from staff about exposure to radiation when removing these containers, one of them broke and spread some of its contents on the floor of the plant, as it has been reported.

In August 2017 the Spanish government did not renew its operating licence, and the reactor will be decommissioned.

A 710 MW solar plant with a 780 MWh battery is planned for the site.

== Garoña vessel inspection ==
In March 2015 Nuclenor announced that inspections made in November and December 2014 checked the reactor vessel good condition, with no manufacturing defects detected. More than forty GE Hitachi and Tecnatom experts collected data from nine million points on the vessel's surface, for more than 1000 hours and using advanced ultrasound systems and submersible robots.
