= Arjun Makhijani =

American nuclear engineer and activist

Arjun Makhijani is a nuclear engineer who is president of the anti-nuclear organization, the Institute for Energy and Environmental Research. Makhijani has written reports analyzing the safety, economics, and efficiency of various energy sources.

== Education ==
Makhijani has a Ph.D. (Engineering), from the University of California, Berkeley, where he specialized in nuclear fusion.

== Publications ==
Arjun Makhijani has written publications analyzing the safety, economics, and efficiency of various energy sources, including nuclear power and renewable energy sources such as wind power and solar energy. He was also the principal author of the first overview study on Energy and Agriculture in the Third World (Ballinger 1975). He was one of the principal technical staff of the Ford Foundation Energy Policy Project, and a co-author of its final report, A Time to Choose.

== Awards ==
In 1989, Dr Makhijani received The John Bartlow Martin Award for Public Interest Magazine Journalism of the Medill School of Journalism, Northwestern University, with Robert Alvarez; was awarded the Josephine Butler Nuclear Free Future Award in 2001; the 2007/2008 Jane Bagley Lehman Award for Excellence in Public Advocacy by the Tides Foundation.

== See also ==
- Anti-nuclear movement in the United States
