= US Nuclear Corp =

United States radiation detection holding company

US Nuclear Corporation is a US radiation detection holding company headquartered in Canoga Park, CA specializing in the development and manufacturing of radiation detection instrumentation. It supplies instrumentation to nuclear power plants, national laboratories, government agencies, homeland security, military and weapon makers, universities and schools, research companies, hospitals, as well as energy companies.

== Products ==
Products include:

- Radiation Air and Water Monitors
- Aerial reconnaissance
- alpha, beta, gamma and tritium monitors
- DroneRAD aerial radiation detection
- Vehicle monitors, personnel monitors, exit monitors and room monitors
- Radon air monitors and radon switch products
- Handheld survey meters and personal dosimeters
- Pocket micro-R meters
- Port security equipment
- software solutions

== Operating divisions ==
US Nuclear Corp has three divisions:

- Technical Associates, founded in 1946 as a spin off from the Manhattan Project, built the first industrial grade radiation monitors.
- Overhoff Technology Corporation, design and manufacturing of high quality tritium monitors
- Electronic Control Concepts (ECC), X-ray equipment

== See also ==
- Radioactivity
