= New England Coalition =

Anti-nuclear organization in Vermont

The New England Coalition (NEC), originally New England Coalition on Nuclear Pollution, is an educational non-profit organization based in Brattleboro, Vermont. Historically, it has been part of the anti-nuclear movement in the United States.

The NEC is primarily concerned with legal action more than protests. It was involved in both legal action and protests about the Yankee Rowe Nuclear Power Plant prior to its shut down in 1992, and was involved in legal action and protests over extending the license to operate at the Vermont Yankee Nuclear Power Plant. Since 2014 it has been working towards requiring the owners of Vermont Yankee to implement a hardened underground storage system for their highly radioactive nuclear waste by legal interventions through the Vermont Public Service Board.

== Actions ==
New England Coalition actions include the following:

- Nuclear Regulatory Commission and Seabrook

The NEC began legal work on the Seabrook Station Nuclear Power Plant in 1973 with legal arguments that it was not safely sited, designed, or built. Additionally the NEC presented testimony that was not economically needed.

In 1990, the Nuclear Regulatory Commission (NRC) waved its own rules on emergency planning at Seabrook, an action that seemed to indicate the lessons of Three Mile Island had not been learned. The New England Coalition took legal action appealing to the Supreme Court. The appeal was denied.

- Vermont Yankee

The NEC participated as a full party in the United States government licensing procedures for the Vermont Yankee Nuclear Power Plant (VY). The NEC also has undertaken repeated interventions before the NRC, in 1977 and 1987, to challenge increases in the amount of nuclear waste stored at VY.

In 1999, the NEC intervened in the sale of VY to Amergen. This intervention was successful.

In 2002, the NEC intervened to set conditions on the sale of VY to Entergy. This intervention made possible a subsequent intervention on the power uprate at the plant, which took place before both houses of the Vermont legislature.

Starting in 2008, the NEC has been intervening to prevent the relicensing of VY. According to the Nuclear Regulatory Commission, as of April, 2010, the licensing process has set a record for being the longest in history, with credit due to the New England Coalition. The specific action causing the delay was the NEC contention that the mathematics associated with managing the aging plant were defective.

- Yankee Rowe

The NEC joined the Union of Concerned Scientists in an effort to shut down the Yankee Rowe Nuclear Power Plant. The plant was closed in 1992.

- Actions before the Vermont Legislature

The NEC helped write Vermont's Act 296, a law covering radioactive waste disposal.

== Current action ==
As a result of the tritium leak at VY, on February 9, 2010, the NEC filed a 10 CFR 2.206 Enforcement Petition requesting that the Nuclear Regulatory Commission (NRC) undertake enforcement actions in response to a series of problems including:

- Growing concentrations of radioactive material in the groundwater and soil at VY,
- Entergy's failure to understand and know VY's design, layout, and construction,
- An inadequate plan for managing aging underground pipes at the plant, and
- The NRC's failure to realize there was a problem until it was self-revealed.

The NRC was asked to perform various actions including the following:

- Put VY into cold shutdown to stop or slow the leak and isolate it,
- Require that VY re-establish its licensing basis,
- Determine why Entergy was allowed to operate VY without adequate knowledge of its systems,
- Undertake a full Diagnostic Evaluation Team Inspection (the equivalent of an Independent Safety Assessment conducted at Maine Yankee), and
- Require that Entergy change its License Renewal to address aging analysis and include aging management for all piping that might carry radionuclides.

== See also ==
- Environmental Movement
- List of anti-nuclear groups in the United States
- List of anti-nuclear protests in the United States
