= Committee for Nuclear Responsibility =

The Committee for Nuclear Responsibility was formed as a "political and educational organization to disseminate anti-nuclear views and information to the public". The goals of the organization were a moratorium on nuclear power and the commercialization of alternative energy sources.

John Gofman founded the Committee for Nuclear Responsibility in 1971, as a small non-profit, public interest association with four Nobel Laureates on its board. These Nobel scientists were Linus Pauling, Harold Urey, George Wald and James D. Watson. Other scientists who were involved included Paul Ehrlich, John Edsall, and Richard E. Bellman. The Board of Directors included Lewis Mumford, Ramsey Clark, Ian MacHarg, and Richard Max McCarthy. Actor Jack Lemmon endorsed the goals of the Committee for Nuclear Responsibility.

== See also ==
- Anti-nuclear groups in the United States
- Anti-nuclear movement in the United States
