= Critical Mass Energy Project =

Anti-nuclear group in the United States

The Critical Mass Energy Project was formed by Ralph Nader in 1974 as a national anti-nuclear umbrella group. It was probably the largest national anti-nuclear group in the United States, with several hundred local affiliates and an estimated 200,000 supporters. Part of Nader's support comes from a Green agenda and the belief that "the most important office in America for anyone to achieve is full-time citizen." The organization's main efforts were directed at lobbying activities and providing local groups with scientific and other resources to campaign against nuclear power.

The first national anti-nuclear conference, "Critical Mass '74" was held in Washington D.C. under the sponsorship of Ralph Nader. Workshops were held and groups throughout the United States learned about forming anti-nuclear organizations. At about the same time, Karen Silkwood, a nuclear plant worker, was killed in a car crash while investigating her nuclear energy company. There was speculation that the crash may have been intended.

The second Critical Mass conference was held in November 1975, and this involved a candlelight vigil in front of the White House for Karen Silkwood.

== See also ==
- Anti-nuclear groups in the United States
- Anti-nuclear movement in the United States
