= Performers and Artists for Nuclear Disarmament =

20th-century artist collective

Performers and Artists for Nuclear Disarmament (PAND), also called Performing Artists for Nuclear Disarmament, was a loose coalition of activist collectives made up of performers and artists. PAND chapters formed across the United States and Europe in the early 1980s to organize arts events, protest nuclear proliferation, raise funds to support peace and environmental causes, and heighten awareness of the threat of nuclear weapons. Several PAND chapters including the Cleveland and New York City collectives formed in 1982, a year when anti-nuclear activism culminated in the largest ever anti-war demonstration in support of the Second United Nations Special Session on Disarmament. The demonstration held in Central Park was attended by close to a million people.

By the mid-1980s, several European PAND chapters were established and in 1983, the artist Harry Belafonte, who was one of the principle organizers of the New York City PAND collective, founded PAND International. In 1990 PAND International, led by Arthur Strimling, a New York theater director and PAND International Vice President, collaborated with the performance artist Suzanne Lacy and a Finnish PAND chapter to produce a Meeting of the Worlds Festival—"a music and art gathering on the theme of world peace"—in Joensuu, Finland. The Meeting of the Worlds Festival, billed as a "global gathering" by the Los Angeles Times, included performances by the Los Angeles Philharmonic, the Leningrad Philharmonic, and musical artists David Byrne and Martina Arroyo.

In addition to organizing events, there is evidence that some PAND collectives were involved in publishing and documentary film projects. In spite of the number of prominent cultural figures and artists who were involved in PAND collectives and affiliated with PAND sponsored events, there is little formal information available about the collectives themselves, their governance, and what factors contributed to their eventual dissolution. This lack of documentation may reflect the rhizomic nature of these groups or a diminishing cultural interest in nuclear disarmament campaigns.

== New York City PAND Collective ==
Cartoonist and author, Jules Feiffer founded the New York City PAND chapter in collaboration with other prominent New York artists including Robert Altman, Harry Belafonte, Jill Clayburgh, Eliot Feld and Harold Prince in 1982 in order to "'mobilize people in the performing arts to use their skills, talents and public access to halt the ongoing drive toward mass destruction.'' NYC PAND members and sponsors purportedly included notable figures in the New York performing arts community including Jane Fonda, Meryl Streep, Colleen Dewhurst, and Joseph Papp. In 1983, the New York City PAND chapter sponsored series of traveling theatrical performances intended to provoke a dialogue about nuclear disarmament across New York State. Dubbing themselves a "caravan," artists and artist collectives including Emily Mann, Joanne Akalaitis, Ben Maddow, Paul Zaloom, Rebecca Wells, the Talking Band, and the Bread and Puppet Theater staged events as part of the PAND "road show" at cafes and college theaters in several cities including Schenectady and Saratoga Springs.
