= International Network of Engineers and Scientists for Global Responsibility =

Global non-profit for science and technology's ethical use

The International Network of Engineers and Scientists for global responsibility (INES) is an independent non-profit-organization concerned about the impact of science and technology on society.

INES efforts focus on disarmament and international peace, ethics in science, responsibilities of scientists and the responsible use of science and technology, just and sustainable development.

INES was founded in 1991 in Berlin at the international congress Challenges - Science and Peace in a Rapidly Changing Environment and has become a network of over 200 organisations and individual members.

== Challenges for Scientists and Engineers ==
Rapid changes in our environment and our societies are forcing us to become more conscious of our role in the world. Science and technology are employed in a worldwide competition for military and economic power. The impacts of this competition have global implications. We have entered a phase in which global developments are in conflict with basic requirements for human survival. Large stocks of weapons of mass destruction, the overexploitation of limited common resources, and a heavily unbalanced world economy provide fundamental challenges to human civilisation and may even threaten its existence.

Engineers and scientists play a key role, both in developing new knowledge that might threaten international security and in providing positive solutions for the future. They are as much a part of the problem as they can be a part of the solution.

== Activities ==
- Lobbies for nuclear disarmament and sustainable science.
- Works for the reduction of military spending.
- Promotes the awareness of ethical principles and the specific responsibility of engineers and scientists.
- Participates in whistleblowing campaigns, which support those who have been victimised for acting upon such principles.
- Encourages and facilitates public discourse and international communication among concerned scientists.
- Organises international conferences and regional workshops.
- Raises public awareness.
- Promotes environmentally sound technologies.
- Supports publishing books, e.g., Einstein, Peace Now!; Joseph Rotblat: Visionary for Peace.

INES is a member of the International Peace Bureau (IPB) and closely cooperates with IPB as well as the International Physicians for the Prevention of Nuclear War (IPPNW) and the International Association of Lawyers Against Nuclear Arms (IALANA).

INES actively participates in the Middle Powers Initiative (MPI) and has been present at the European Social Forums since 2000 and at the World Social Forums. INES participates in the World Social Forum on Sciences.

== Goals ==
- Abolition of nuclear weapons
- Promoting the responsible and sustainable use of science and technology
- Implementing ethical principles in the education of scientists and engineers

== INES Bodies ==
=== Council ===
The INES Council elects an Executive Committee to implement the decisions of the Council and to manage the overall activities of the Network. Member organizations may designate one of its own members as a Council representative.

=== Executive committee ===
The INES Executive Committee implements the decisions of the Council and manages overall activities of the Network which cannot be taken care of by decentralized action within the Network. The Executive Committee shall serve as the official representative of the Network. The Executive Committee appoints an Executive Secretary who shall implement its decisions and shall be responsible to the Executive Committee. It also determines the duties and responsibilities of all other staff employed by the Central Network Office.

=== Advisory Council ===
The INES Executive Committee may invite individuals to an, which can be asked to give advice on specific issues related to the Networks activities.

== See also ==
- Nuclear Weapons: The Road to Zero
- International Campaign to Abolish Nuclear Weapons
- Anti-nuclear organizations
- List of books about nuclear issues
- List of films about nuclear issues
