= Committee for a Nuclear Free Island =

The Committee for a Nuclear Free Island was an anti-nuclear group based in Staten Island, New York in the 1980s.

In 1983, the United States Navy announced that, it was seeking an East Coast location for a Surface Action Group. One of the sites that the Navy proposed was Staten Island, New York. In response, a small number of anti-nuclear and peace activists organized the Committee for a Nuclear Free Island. Most of them doubted a site in New York Harbor would actually be selected.

After the site selection, the Committee for a Nuclear Free Island rapidly expanded its membership and formed a coalition with anti-nuclear and peace groups in the greater New York City area. Members distributed over thirty thousand pieces of literature throughout Staten Island and issued analyses of the Navy's various Environmental Impact Statements, printing the analyses for the public in Staten Island's weekly newspaper, the Staten Island Register. The coalition checked on the credentials of Environmental Impact Statement authors, finding one fraudulent doctorate degree that resulted in breaking up a public hearing.

As a result of cutbacks in military and naval numbers, a Base Realignment and Closing Commission determined that the naval station on Staten Island was in excess of requirements, and it was cancelled before being completed.
