= Two Futures Project =

American Christian anti-nuclear weaponry movement

The Two Futures Project (2FP) is a movement made up of American Christians who support and work towards the abolition of all nuclear weapons. This organization believes that human beings face two futures and one choice: a world without nuclear weapons or a world ruined by them. 2FP is supportive of concrete and practical steps to reduce nuclear dangers immediately, while pursuing the multilateral, global, irreversible, and verifiable elimination of nuclear weapons, as a biblically-grounded mandate and as a contemporary security imperative. In order to make these changes in the world they are using a strategy based around the creation of a non-partisan, conscience-driven, enduring majority of Americans who are committed to a nuclear weapons-free world. Two Futures Project seeks to join one voice of Christian conscience, to encourage and enable national leaders to make the complete elimination of nuclear weapons the organizing principle of American nuclear weapons policy. The founder and director of the Two Futures Project is Rev. Tyler Wigg-Stevenson.

== Activities ==
The Two Futures Project continues to work in many areas. The activities of 2FP include participation in the 2009 Q Conference. As well as continuing contributions in 2010 to www.qideas.org. 2FP participated in forums at Washington National Cathedral in 2009 and Malone University in 2010. The larger work of Two Futures Project is in the area of making change and here 2FP has been active with work on the New START Treaty, a conference parallel to the Nuclear Summit conference held in 2010, and 2FP has also been active in commenting on the Nuclear issue like in the case of the Posture Review. As the Two Futures Project continues to participate in this array of activities they have not forgotten their Christian calling and continue to bring the Christian community into these activities as well.

== Endorsements ==
2FP has endorsements from the following individuals: George P. Shultz, Paul Alexander, Leith Anderson, Robert C. Andringa, Rob Bell, Tony Campolo, Noel Castellanos, Richard Cizik, Shane Claiborne, Andy Crouch, Margaret Feinberg, David Gushee, Ambassador (ret.) James Goodby, Ambassador Tony Hall, Joel Hunter, Bill Hybels, Lynne Hybels, Kevin Kelly, Mark Labberton, Jo Anne Lyon, Brian McLaren, Jonathan Merritt, David Neff, Sam Rodriguez, Richard Rohr, O.F.M., Ronald J. Sider, Glen Stassen, Rev. Dr. John R. W. Stott, CBE, Cameron Strang, Chaplain (Colonel) Paul Vicalvi, United States Army, Retired, Miroslav Volf, Jim Wallis, Ambassador (ret.) George F. Ward, and James Emery White.

== Criticism ==
2FP has been criticized by the Family Research Council for its support of the New START agreement, as well as by the Institute for Religion and Democracy for various reasons.
