= Frieda Berryhill =

American activist

Frieda Berryhill (née Alberer, 15 February 1922 – 20 June 2012) was an American anti-nuclear and peace activist.

Berryhill was born in Waidhofen an der Ybbs, Austria, during the turbulent times after World War I and the economic crisis bringing right-wing movements to power in several countries in Europe. After World War II, she met an American officer, emigrated to the United States and settled in North Carolina where they were married.

She became an American citizen in 1949. During the 1970s she supported the referendum against the first nuclear power plant in her homeland: the Zwentendorf Nuclear Power Plant. Her greatest achievement was the opposition ("Coalition for Nuclear Power Postponement") to a nuclear power plant planned by Delmarva Power on the banks of the Chesapeake & Delaware Canal.

In 2006, she warned of the consequences of a nuclear attack on Iran. She also protested against the Patriot Act and took part in demonstrations in Washington D.C.

She died in Wilmington, Delaware. The Indian consultant Arun Shrivastava published an obituary on 15 November 2012.

== See also ==
- Ellen Thomas
- List of books about nuclear issues
- List of nuclear whistleblowers
- Nuclear disarmament
- Nuclear weapons and the United States
- Nevada Test Site
- Alvin C. Graves
- National Security Archive
