= Shad Alliance =

The Shad Alliance was an active and influential anti-nuclear group which used non-violent, direct action methods in the late 1970s and 1980s. It grew out of the "alliance movement" started in New Hampshire by the Clamshell Alliance. The Shad Alliance linked anti-nuclear activists on Long Island, in New York City, and throughout the Hudson River area, and targeted the Indian Point and Shoreham nuclear power plants.

On June 3, 1979, a large demonstration at Shoreham was organized by the Shad Alliance. About 18,000 people marched on Shoreham nuclear plant and 500 climbed the perimeter fence to occupy the plant in an act of civil disobedience. Police made 571 arrests. Catherine Green née Synan was one of the original founders of the Shad Alliance on Long Island.

The Shoreham Nuclear Power Plant was completed at a cost of $6 billion but was closed by protests in 1989 without generating any commercial electrical power.

== See also ==
- Abalone Alliance
- Anti-nuclear movement in the United States
- List of anti-nuclear protests in the United States
