= Institute for Energy and Environmental Research =

- Abbreviation: IEER
- Formation: 1987
- Type: Nonprofit organization
- Purpose: Environmental impacts of nuclear weapons production, energy policy, ozone depletion
- Headquarters: Takoma Park, Maryland, United States

The Institute for Energy and Environmental Research (IEER) is an anti-nuclear organization which focuses on the environmental safety of nuclear weapons production, ozone layer depletion, and other issues relating to energy. IEER publishes a variety of books on energy-related issues, conducts workshops for activists on nuclear issues, and sponsors international symposia and educational outreach projects. IEER was established in 1987 and is based in Takoma Park, Maryland.

Arjun Makhijani is President of the Institute for Energy and Environmental Research.

== See also ==
- Anti-nuclear groups in the United States
- Efficient energy use
- List of nuclear accidents
- Nuclear whistleblowers
- Nuclear safety
- Renewable energy commercialization
