= Clamshell Alliance =

Anti-nuclear organization in U.S. state of New Hampshire

The logo of the Clamshell Alliance

The Clamshell Alliance is an anti-nuclear organization founded in 1976 to oppose the Seabrook Station nuclear power plant in the U.S. state of New Hampshire.

The group was co-founded by Paul Gunter, Howie Hawkins, Howard Morland, Harvey Wasserman, Guy Chichester, Robert "Renny" Cushing, Jeff Brummer, Anna Gyorgy, Kristie Conrad, Kate Walker, Robin Read, and other activists in 1976. The Granite State Alliance, a social-change organization, had launched PEP, the People's Energy Project, several years earlier, in opposition to the proposed Seabrook nuclear power plant. The Clamshell Alliance's coalescence began in 1975 as New England activists and organizations began to respond to U.S. president Richard Nixon's "Project Independence", which sought to build 1,000 nuclear power plants by 2000.

In 2007, veterans of the Clamshell Alliance marked the 30th anniversary of its founding with the creation of a website called "To the Village Square: Nukes, Clams and Democracy", which relates the story of the Clamshell Alliance and why it matters today. The Clamshell Alliance opposes all nuclear power in New England.

== Activities ==
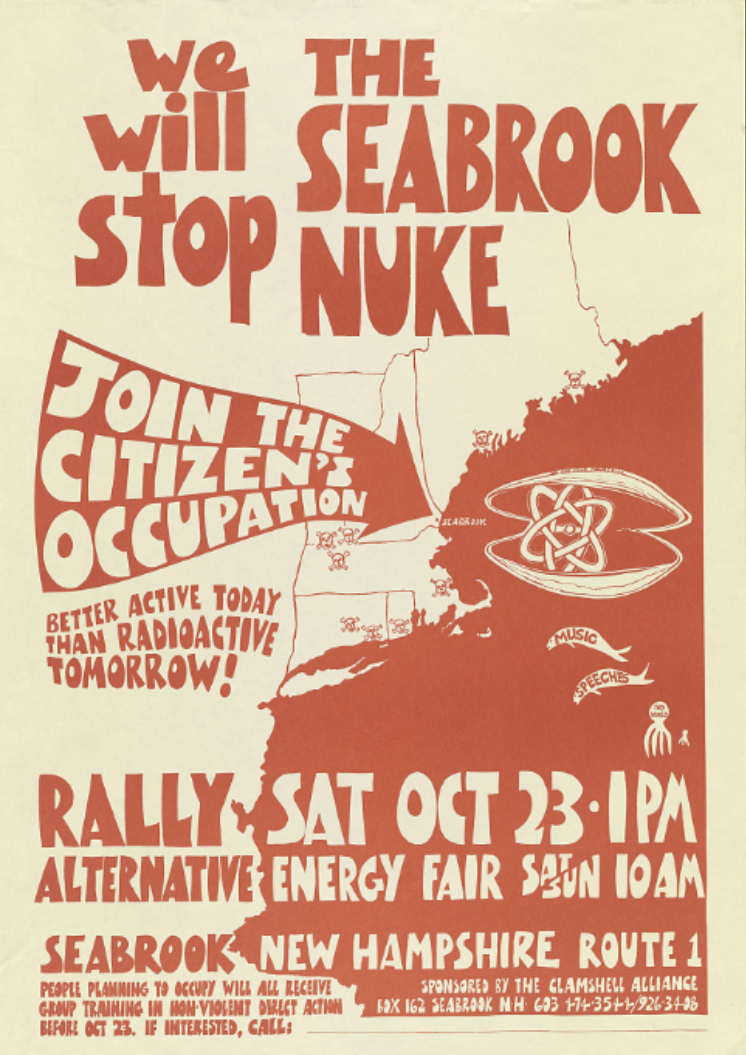
Poster by the Clamshell Alliance promoting the occupation of the Seabrook Station Nuclear Power Plant construction site, 1977

The alliance conducted non-violent demonstrations in the late 1970s and 1980s. Clamshell protesters occupied the Seabrook Station Nuclear Power Plant construction site with multiple protests to delay construction.

In July 1976 the Clamshell Alliance adopted a Declaration of Nuclear Resistance as a guiding set of principles in a meeting of 60-75 activists.

On August 1, 1976, 18 New Hampshire residents were arrested for criminal trespass and disorderly conduct in Clamshell's first civil disobedience action on the Seabrook site. Three weeks later, a second occupation involved 180 New England residents who were arrested and held in a local armory overnight.

On May 1, 1977, over 2,000 protesters occupied the Seabrook Nuclear Power Plant construction site. 1,414 of these activists were arrested. Republican governor Meldrim Thomson, Jr. convinced the district judges not to release them on their own recognizance and made the bail $500. The defendants refused to pay the bail as a form of bail solidarity. They were held in jails and National Guard armories for up to two weeks. On May 13, 1977, 550 demonstrators were released without having to post bail because the cost of the imprisonment was costing New Hampshire tens of thousands of dollars. At the time it was one of the largest mass arrests in United States history. The number of arrests was three times more than the New Hampshire prison system capacity. Clamshell activists used this detention for training and networking, and long considered the detention a blunder on the part of the governor.

Richard Asinof wrote:

"The overwhelming success of the Clamshell Alliance's occupation can be attributed to three factors; the planning and leadership of the Clamshell Alliance itself; the strength of the affinity group and the spirit and discipline of the occupiers; and the strong impact that women in key leadership roles exerted on the events."

In later years, New Hampshire authorities minimized the impact of mass civil disobedience at the Seabrook plant by treating activist trespass as a violation, and allowing community service in lieu of fines. Actions were still media events capable of swaying public opinion, but their larger impact was limited. Clamshell Alliance members attempted to have their actions taken more seriously by the courts, and began staging sit-ins of the office of Republican Governor Judd Gregg. While this action resulted in jail time for criminal trespass, the local courts would not rule on the question of "competing harms" or the "Right of Revolution" granted by the New Hampshire Constitution. Activist Guy Chichester eventually sawed down a Seabrook Station emergency warning siren pole, resulting in charges of "criminal mischief", a Class B felony. Although there was no doubt that he had cut down the pole, Chichester was acquitted. In his appeal Chichester's lawyer Patrick Fleming argued that according to article 10 of the New Hampshire state constitution, any citizen has a right to act to protect his or herself when the state fails to do so, which is known as the "Right of Revolution:"

"[Art.] 10. [Right of Revolution.] Government being instituted for the common benefit, protection, and security, of the whole community, and not for the private interest or emolument of any one man, family, or class of men; therefore, whenever the ends of government are perverted, and public liberty manifestly endangered, and all other means of redress are ineffectual, the people may, and of right ought to reform the old, or establish a new government. The doctrine of nonresistance against arbitrary power, and oppression, is absurd, slavish, and destructive of the good and happiness of mankind."

The Clamshell Alliance was an inspiration to other communities who wished to organize opposition to nuclear power plants. Hundreds of groups with similar names, such as the Abalone Alliance in California, adopted similar non-violent organizing techniques to oppose nuclear power and nuclear weapons around the country and internationally.

== 1978: New England Clam splits ==
In 1978 the Clamshell Alliance split after the Coordinating Committee (CC) agreed to call off a large disobedience planned at the power plant site in June. This was made as an "Emergency Decision", bypassing the normal consensus process obtaining input and consensus by regional Clam groups. The state government of New Hampshire, feeling that a massive arrest on the site would overwhelm the state, undermine support and finance for the Seabrook nuclear project, and also result in the costs of hiring police from neighboring states, incarcerating thousands of Clams and paying court expenses, offered to let Clamshell hold a solar power fair and concert on the site. This proposal was eventually accepted by Clamshell and a highly successful rally of 20,000 people was held on the site with thousands of Clams also camped out on the Seabrook site. But the political consequences within Clamshell led to a split in the Alliance and the eventual formation of the Coalition for Direct action at Seabrook (CDAS).

The Rath Proposal, made by NH Attorney General Tom Rath, for a rally on the site was first vigorously debated within Clamshell. Clamshell eventually "accepted" the Rath proposal, through normal Alliance wide consensus process, with a list of conditions very unfavorable to continued Seabrook nuclear construction and operation that the state government and Public Service Company of New Hampshire, owner of Seabrook, would not accept. But the Rath proposal helped exacerbate tensions within the Alliance among those calling for more radical action, those supporting more classic civil disobedience, and those who were beginning to question the usefulness of large civil disobedience actions in the Seacoast; as well as tensions between local Seacoast residents and supporters, who were providing land for thousands of Clams to camp and stage the occupation, and Clams living far away, many of whom scheduled vacations for a non-violent occupation and likely time in custody. The political tension within Clamshell, combined with pressure from authorities on locals, a media frenzy with anticipatory headlines such as "Kent State at Seabrook?", finally resulted in local landowners withdrawing their land as camping and staging sites near the Seabrook site. What is clear is that Seacoast landowners did not feel that the thousands of Clams expected to arrive on their land were thousands of supporters who would do what was needed to help protect them from harm. Clamshell had allowed a gap to grow between the local supporters and the Alliance as a whole that was exploited by the State and the Seabrook builders.

The Emergency Decision was undertaken to accept the Rath proposal and hold a legal rally on site and at the same time to hold a mass non-violent civil disobedience at NRC headquarters in downtown Washington, D.C. The original intent was for a "Clamtrack" journey by train of thousands of Clams to blockade the NRC that would license the Seabrook plant. It seemed like an excellent tactical pivot at the time by those making the decision. Seabrook construction had been halted before by an NRC Board meeting in Manchester, New Hampshire, in a building surrounded by perhaps two thousand Clams. Thousands of Clams showing up in Washington for a nonviolent action at the NRC would certainly shake things up. Clam organizer Chuck Matthai in discussions of what to do after the landowners withdrew land advised Clams to reshape their imagination in response to changed circumstances. This led to what key organizers and the CC felt was a good path forward. Unfortunately, the Emergency Decision was widely considered a violation of the spirit of the consensus process that had governed Clam decision making. The rally at Seabrook took place, but the civil disobedience action at the NRC, though spirited, was small.

By the spring of 1978, in preparation for the June 24 action, over 5,000 Clams had been trained in non-violence by Clamshell non-violence trainers, and organized into affinity groups of roughly 5 to 20 people, with the affinity groups organized into regional cluster groups of roughly 200 to 500 members. Each affinity group met to decide issues by consensus, and the clusters operated typically by an affinity groups spokes-council. The highly anticipated action, scheduled to begin June 24, 1978, would have been by far the largest civil disobedience action of its kind.

Many Clamshell members felt that the agreement which was made as an "emergency decision" was a betrayal of the democratic consensus process that was an integral part of Clamshell's organization just at the time when the state and the Public Service Company of New Hampshire appeared at their most vulnerable. The Emergency Decision mechanism had been adopted in spring of 1978 after NH State Police were discovered by Robin Read and Cathy Wolff looking out the window at a van parked across the street from the Clamshell office at 92 Congress Street in Portsmouth photographing members attending a New England-wide Coordinating Committee meeting. It was reasonably feared that the state would undertake preemptive arrests of the CC (Coordinating Committee) members to disrupt the action.

The Emergency Decision mechanism to allow decisions without the normal consensus process of sending CC proposals back to Clamshell regions and their affinity groups to obtain consensus was suggested by Roy Morrison of the ORTF (Occupation/Restoration Task Force) that was planning the June 1978 action. All plans of the ORTF were submitted to the CC and the normal consensus process. The intent of the Emergency Decision-making mechanism was to allow, in cases of mass arrests of CC member or other similar disruptive state action, to allow the CC or a reconstituted CC, to make emergency decisions by consensus without sending the proposal back to regional groups for the normal and necessarily slow back and forth consensus process. This Emergency Decision making mechanism was adopted after concerns were raised that it was a means to allow the action to become more radical, and to adopt measures such as fence cutting to gain access to the Seabrook site. No one suggested it was potentially a tool to abandon an action.

== CDAS ==
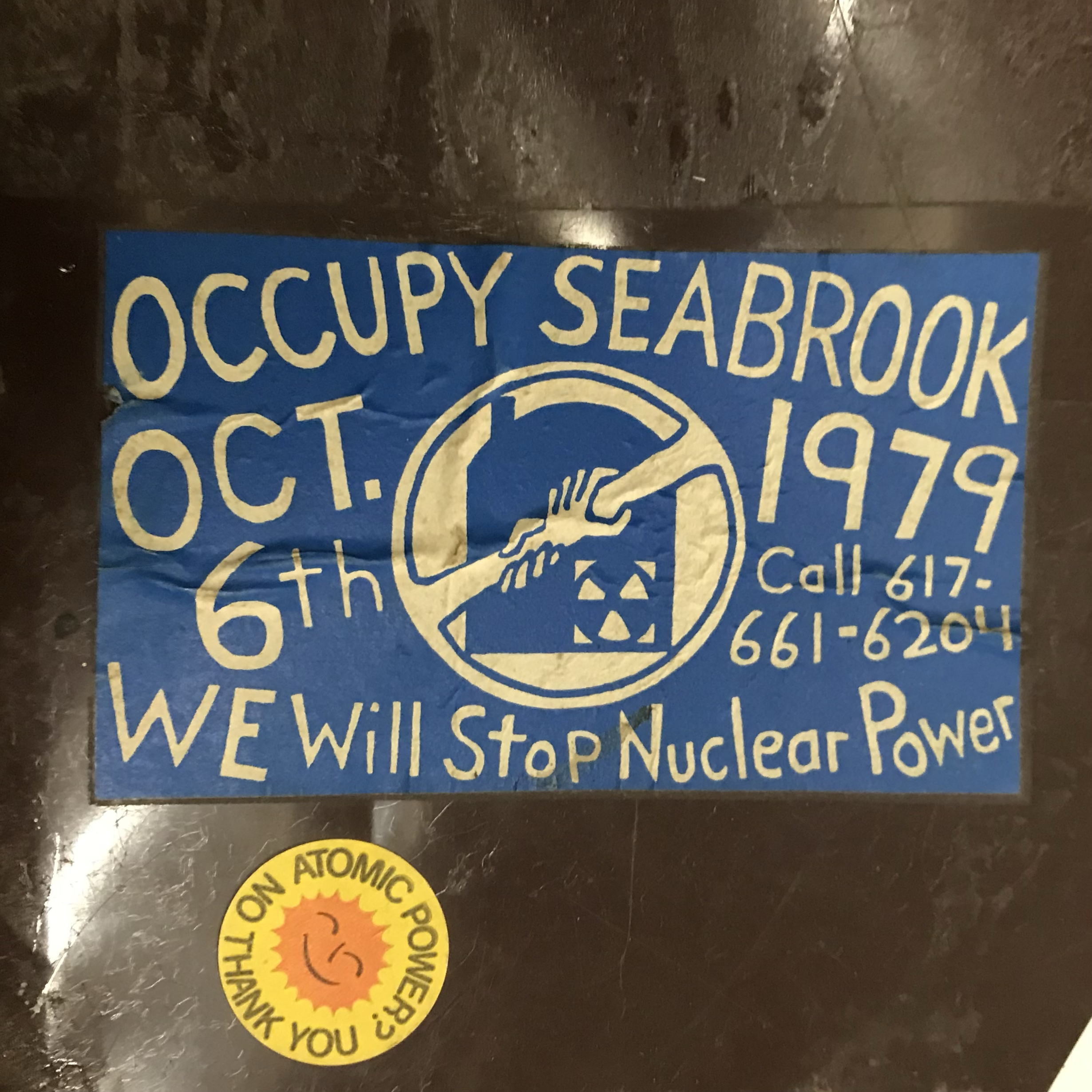
Occupy Seabrook, October 6 1979

The dissidents within Clam broke off to form another organization to be called the Coalition for Direct Action at Seabrook (CDAS), which would take more militant but still nonviolent action on the site.

Composed of several "clusters" throughout New England and metropolitan New York that were themselves composed of smaller "affinity groups", CDAS decided, using the consensus process, to attempt to occupy the power plant site. The first attempted occupation was planned for October 1979, and activists agreed that they would be willing to tear down fencing protecting the site but avoid fighting with police when confronted and also try to avoid arrest. The new strategy was controversial, and many former Clamshell members decided not to get involved once the more confrontational tactics were decided on. Many of the demonstrators would equip themselves with helmets and gas masks in anticipation of police violence against them, and the critics argued that this would be too provocative.

Nevertheless, the attempted occupation on October 6, 1979, drew over 2,500 activists who felt energized after growing disillusionment with nuclear power with the near meltdown at the Three Mile Island nuclear plant in Pennsylvania a few months earlier. The activists made several attempts to get through fencing and at one point entered the site but were met by state police equipped with pepper spray, tear gas, and in one case, a fire hose spraying water on them. Dozens of arrests were made. The occupation was not successful in taking over the site but drew much national media attention.

CDAS, regrouping over the following winter, again attempted an occupation on the site in April 1980. This time, a smaller group of activists, about 2,000, met police at the fences but were also repulsed by the police.

== 1980s and beyond ==
The following year, several hundred Clams attempted to block the delivery of the first reactor containment vessel to the site, but police kept the roads clear. This was the last large New England Clamshell Action. The Coalition dissolved not long afterward after stirring a lot of debate in the anti-nuclear movement about what could be considered appropriate tactics in a non-violent movement.

In the 1980s numerous civil disobedience actions were organized by New Hampshire-based Clams with a Concord Clam office headquarters. Several thousand were arrested at the Seabrook site. One of the largest actions took place on the day of the Tiananmen Square massacre, on June 4, 1989. Over 1,000 Clams were arrested after climbing the fence, opposing Seabrook plant licensing and operation. Clamshell carpenters had built hinged ladders which allowed Clams to quickly climb over the fence without cutting fences, and kept the enforcers on the inside of the fence and unable to come out and attack demonstrators. Numerous actions took place at the New Hampshire State House with sit-ins at the Governor's office to oppose Seabrook licensing.

Public Service Company of New Hampshire, the utility with majority ownership of the Seabrook Station, was bankrupted by the project. Governor Hugh J. Gallen had signed legislation prohibiting the utility from billing consumers for the costs of construction work in progress (CWIP), and the Three Mile Island accident had increased awareness and added the requirement for an evacuation plan prior to commissioning. In the end, only one of the two planned reactors went on line.

In 2007, veterans of the Clamshell Alliance marked the 30th anniversary of its founding with the creation of a website called "To the Village Square: Nukes, Clams and Democracy", which relates the story of the Clamshell Alliance.

== See also ==
- Anti-nuclear movement in the United States
- Anti-nuclear protests in the United States
- Abalone Alliance
- Shad Alliance
- Michael F. Brennan
- Macy Morse
- NIMBY, acronym for the phrase "not in my back yard"
