= Anti-nuclear protests in the United States =

Protests against nuclear power and weapons in the United States

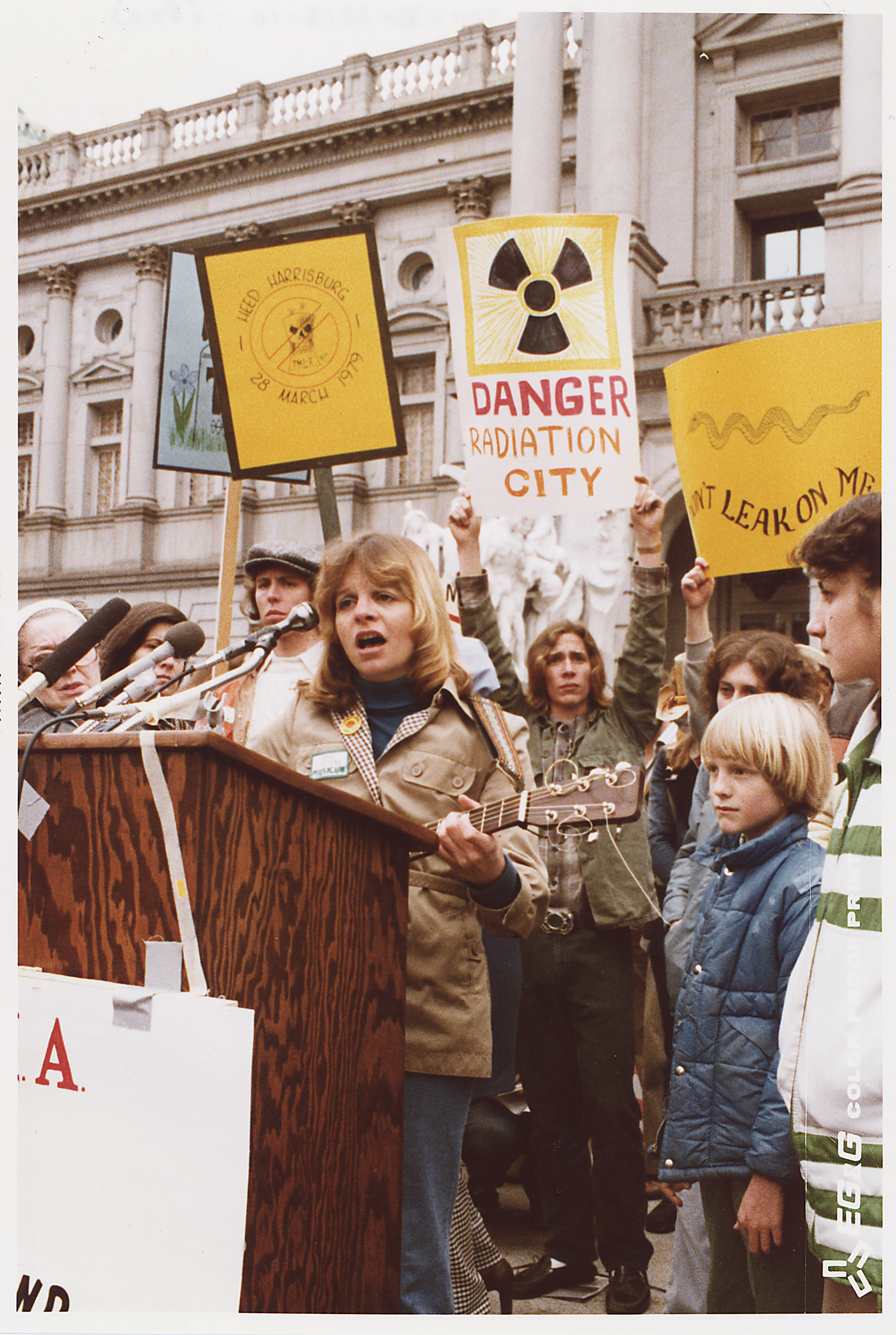
Anti-nuclear protest at Harrisburg, Pennsylvania, in 1979, following the Three Mile Island Accident.

Anti-nuclear protests in the United States have occurred since the development of nuclear power plants in the United States. Examples include Clamshell Alliance protests at Seabrook Station Nuclear Power Plant, Abalone Alliance protests at Diablo Canyon Power Plant, and those following the Three Mile Island accident in 1979.

Beginning with the Manhattan Project (1942–46), the discussion surrounding nuclear energy and power has been a prominent part of American Society. According to the American Nuclear Society, the first U.S. city to use nuclear power for electricity was Arco, Idaho, in 1955. Due to the nuclear warfare of Hiroshima and Nagasaki, American citizens associated nuclear power with the destruction and deaths of many people. The main two reasons for opposition to nuclear power are expense, and danger for humans and the larger environment. Opponents argue that the cost to build a nuclear reactor is significantly higher than other renewable energy alternatives such as windmills. The anti-nuclear movement reached its peak in the 1970s and aimed to close nuclear power plants as well as stop new construction.

In the 1950s Pres. Dwight D. Eisenhower proposed Atoms for Peace to the United Nations, which sought to increase the sharing of international nuclear materials. This proposal led to increased nuclear weapons development in other countries. Critics of nuclear power were becoming increasingly vocal, expressing concerns about the testing of nuclear weapons in the atmosphere, radioactive fallout, and the potential for radiation to cause genetic mutations. The first World Conference Against Atomic and Hydrogen Bombs was held in Hiroshima in 1955.

The most influential antinuclear protest happened in Seabrook, New Hampshire in April 1977. The town of Seabrook, New Hampshire was the proposed site of a nuclear power facility. The people formed the Clamshell Alliance, which proceeded to train people in nonviolent tactics in order to protect against the construction of a nuclear power plant. On April 30, 1977 the Clamshell Alliance held a protest to shut down construction of the Seabrook power plant. 2,000 people attended, leading to one of the largest mass arrests in the US. On 13 May 1977, the 550 protestors still being detained were released without bail. The protest was non-violent and raised international awareness.

Another influential anti-nuclear power organization was the Abalone Alliance, which organized against the Diablo Canyon Nuclear Power Plant. They used nonviolence and brought attention to the fact that building a power plant next to a fault line could generate an earthquake. During a two-week period, they blocked nuclear plant employees from going to work. The protest ended when the Nuclear Regulatory Commission revoked the Diablo Canyon operating license.

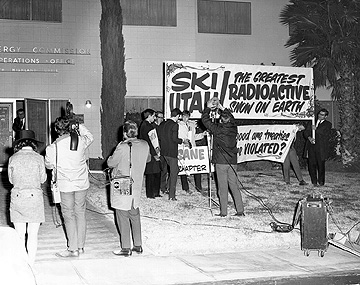
Anti-nuclear protest in Las Vegas

Accidents at nuclear power plants also allowed for the anti-nuclear movement to grow. The accident at Three Mile Island in PA in 1979 sparked further fear, and, combined with protests, led to the halting of construction of further nuclear plants. In 1973, the Nixon Administration launched the “Project Independence” initiative to build 1,000 domestic nuclear power plants by the year 2000. However, the number of reactors peaked in the 1990s at 112, and that number continues to dwindle.

== See also ==
- Anti-nuclear groups in the United States
- List of books about nuclear issues
- Nuclear power in the United States
- Uranium mining and the Navajo people
- List of cancelled nuclear reactors in the United States
- Civil disobedience
- Helen Caldicott
- Paxus Calta
- Harvey Wasserman
- Cayuga Lake
- Environmental racism
- Protest song
- Old Settler's Song (Acres of Clams)

== Bibliography ==
- Brown, Jerry and Rinaldo Brutoco (1997). Profiles in Power: The Anti-nuclear Movement and the Dawn of the Solar Age, Twayne Publishers.
- Cragin, Susan (2007). Nuclear Nebraska: The Remarkable Story of the Little County That Couldn’t Be Bought, AMACOM.
- Dickerson, Carrie B. and Patricia Lemon (1995). Black Fox: Aunt Carrie's War Against the Black Fox Nuclear Power Plant, Council Oak Publishing Company, ISBN 1-57178-009-2
- Fradkin, Philip L. (2004). Fallout: An American Nuclear Tragedy, University of Arizona Press.
- Giugni, Marco (2004). Social Protest and Policy Change: Ecology, Antinuclear, and Peace Movements in Comparative Perspective, Rowman and Littlefield.
- Jasper, James M. (1997). The Art of Moral Protest: Culture, Biography, and Creativity in Social Movements, University of Chicago Press, ISBN 0-226-39481-6
- Lovins, Amory B. and Price, John H. (1975). Non-Nuclear Futures: The Case for an Ethical Energy Strategy, Ballinger Publishing Company, 1975, ISBN 0-88410-602-0
- McCafferty, David P. (1991). The Politics of Nuclear Power: A History of the Shoreham Power Plant, Kluwer.
- Miller, Byron A. (2000). Geography and Social Movements: Comparing Anti-nuclear Activism in the Boston area, University of Minnesota Press.
- Natti, Susanna and Acker, Bonnie (1979). No Nukes: Everyone's Guide to Nuclear Power, South End Press.
- Ondaatje, Elizabeth H. (c1988). Trends in Antinuclear Protests in the United States, 1984–1987, Rand Corporation.
- Peterson, Christian (2003). Ronald Reagan and Antinuclear Movements in the United States and Western Europe, 1981–1987, Edwin Mellen Press.
- Polletta, Francesca (2002). Freedom Is an Endless Meeting: Democracy in American Social Movements, University of Chicago Press, ISBN 0-226-67449-5
- Price, Jerome (1982). The Antinuclear Movement, Twayne Publishers.
- Smith, Jennifer (Editor), (2002). The Antinuclear Movement, Cengage Gale.
- Surbrug, Robert (2009). Beyond Vietnam: The Politics of Protest in Massachusetts, 1974–1990, University of Massachusetts Press.
- Walker, J. Samuel (2004). Three Mile Island: A Nuclear Crisis in Historical Perspective, University of California Press.
- Wellock, Thomas R. (1998). Critical Masses: Opposition to Nuclear Power in California, 1958–1978, University of Wisconsin Press, ISBN 0-299-15850-0
- Wills, John (2006). Conservation Fallout: Nuclear Protest at Diablo Canyon, University of Nevada Press.
