= Stegner =

Stegner is a surname. Notable people with the surname include:

- Jansson Stegner (born 1972), artist based in New York
- Joe Stegner (born 1949), American politician
- Johann Stegner (1866–1954), German politician
- John Stegner (born 1953), American attorney and justice
- Julia Stegner (born 1984), German model
- Lynn Stegner, American author
- Page Stegner (1937–2017), American writer and historian
- Ralf Stegner (born 1959), German politician
- Sarah Stegner, American chef
- Wallace Stegner (1909–1993), American historian, novelist, short story writer, and environmentalist

== See also ==
- Stegner Fellowship, a two-year creative writing fellowship at Stanford University
