= Crossing to Safety =

1987 novel by Wallace Stegner

- First edition cover
- Author: Wallace Stegner
- Publisher: Random House
- Publication date: 1987
- Pages: 277
- ISBN: 978-0-394-56200-1

Crossing to Safety is a 1987 semi-autobiographical novel by "The Dean of Western Writers", Wallace Stegner. One of his works set in the Northeast Kingdom of Vermont, it gained broad literary acclaim and commercial popularity.

In Crossing to Safety, Stegner explores the mysteries of friendship, and it extends Stegner's distinguished body of work that had already earned him a Pulitzer Prize (for 1971's Angle of Repose) and the National Book Award (for 1976's The Spectator Bird). Publishers Weekly described the novel as "an eloquent, wise and immensely moving narrative," and "a meditation on the idealism and spirit of youth, when the world is full of promise, and on the blows and compromises life inevitably inflicts." Stegner's powerful but unassuming narrative traces the bond that develops between the Langs and the Morgans from their first meeting in 1937 through their eventual separation on the occasion of Charity's death from cancer.

== Title ==
The title is taken from the Robert Frost poem "I Could Give All to Time": "I could give all to Time - except / What I myself have held. But why declare / The things forbidden that while the Customs slept / I have crossed to Safety with? For I am There, / And what I would not part with I have kept."

== Plot ==
The narrator, Larry Morgan, wakes up in a familiar rustic cabin in Vermont. This day and scene is returned to several times in the course of the novel. We gradually learn that the Morgans have been summoned to this place to say goodbye to their friend Charity Lang, who is dying of cancer and orchestrating her own death, as she has directed many of the events in the lives of the Morgan and Lang families in the course of their long friendship.

From this perspective, Larry tells the story of the intertwined friendship of these two married couples over the course of decades. It begins in 1937, when Larry and Sid Lang have been hired to teach college in Madison, Wisconsin. Larry and Sally are newly arrived from the West, impoverished, and struggling to adapt. They attend a faculty party where they are adopted by headstrong, self-assured Charity from the Harvard intellectual world and her charming vigorous husband Sid who has inherited wealth and dreams of being a poet. Charity is determined that Sid will succeed intellectually as a professor and considers his poetry a distraction. Larry works nonstop and writes and publishes fiction. Both Sally and Charity are pregnant, expecting their babies at the same time. The foursome have various adventures in Madison, including a nearly catastrophic sail boating accident. Sid is retained by the university, Larry is let go with no prospects of making a living.

Sid and Charity Lang save the Morgans by arranging opportunities for them. Charity invites them to stay at her family's compound at Battell Pond, Vermont. The four of them go on an extended backpacking tour that ends in disaster. Sally is stricken by a disease that cripples her. Again the Langs step in to help the Morgans. Charity is certain that Sid will be tenured in Madison and builds a big house on that prospect. When Sid is let go by the university, Charity has a breakdown, Sid is unemployed, and it is Larry Morgan's turn to save the Langs.

Halfway through the book, Larry the novelist reveals that unlike much fiction, the drama in this story is not due to the breakup of one of these couples, an infidelity, or a crisis in their friendship. They remain faithful couples and friends to the end. The serpent in Eden, as he describes it, is Charity's overbearing self-assurance. She knows what is best for everyone, how things should be done, and cannot be deterred.

When we return to the opening day and scene at the end of the book, Charity has planned her own final exit, excluding Sid from her dying. Sid, who has been overmastered all his life by Charity's strength of character, is lost and distraught; Larry must go and find him.
