= Larry Bogart =

Larry Bogart (January 20, 1914 – August 19, 1991) was a U.S. independent critic of the nuclear power industry. Bogart abandoned a career in public relations in the mid-1960s to organize community groups and speak out about the problems of the "peaceful atom".

In 1966, Bogart founded the Citizens Energy Council, a coalition of environmental groups that published the newsletters "Radiation Perils," "Watch on the A.E.C." and "Nuclear Opponents". These publications argued that "nuclear power plants were too complex, too expensive and so inherently unsafe they would one day prove to be a financial disaster and a health hazard," The Larry Bogart Archives are located at the Thomas J. Dodd Research Center, University of Connecticut and consist of correspondence, administrative records, press releases, news clippings, fliers, legal documents, scientific reports, government reports, newsletters, periodicals, typescripts, interviews, maps, books, audio recordings and photographs. The bulk of the collection dates from 1966 to 1986. The collection chronicles the extent of information available on nuclear energy as it was being published and circulated in local newspapers, government reports, books by American and European publishers, popular periodicals, the alternative press, and by individuals.

The 1980 short film Nuclear Truth featured Larry Bogart discussing the history and future of nuclear power.

== See also ==
- Anti-nuclear movement in the United States
- Atomic Energy Commission
- Anti-nuclear protests in the United States
- Paul Gunter
