= Discovery! The Search for Arabian Oil =

Book by Wallace Stegner

- First edition (1971)
- Author: Wallace Stegner
- Language: English
- Publisher: Selwa Press
- Publication date: 1971/2007
- Publication place: United States
- Media type: Print
- ISBN: 978-0-9701157-4-4
- OCLC: 71809060
- Dewey Decimal: 338.2/7282/09538 22
- LC Class: HD9576.S35 A77 2007

Discovery! The Search for Arabian Oil is a non-fiction book written by Pulitzer Prize winning American author Wallace Stegner.

Written by Stegner in the late 1950s the book was originally serialized in fourteen parts in the magazine Saudi Aramco World in 1970–71 and later published in Beirut Lebanon in 1971 in a limited press run. In 2005, Selwa Press asked Aramco for permission to license this work and present it as an illustrated, fully annotated edition that was released in hardcover in September 2007, the first time it was published in the US.

In late 2007, Selwa's right to publish the book under Stegner's name was questioned by the author's former agent, as well as by Stegner's son and by a biographer.

The book outlines the history of Aramco and the story of the first discoveries of oil in the Persian Gulf region and Saudi Arabia. Stegner wrote a detailed history of the first contacts between representatives from the American oil company Casoc (or Socal) and King Abdul Aziz Ibn Saud of Saudi Arabia and his concessions to the company to search for oil in the kingdom in the 1930s.

== Book Summary ==
The book outlines the beginnings of the discovery of oil in the Persian Gulf during the 1930s by oil companies from around the world. The exploration for oil took place during the depression of the 1930s and companies in the US and other countries were hesitant to spend resources looking for oil. During the 1930s the Persian Gulf, aside from Saudi Arabia, was primarily controlled by the British military and British companies operating in public interest.

The 1930s Kingdom of Abdul Aziz Ibn Saud was a conservative country skeptical of outsiders and the homeland of Islam's main pilgrimage sites and holy cities of Mecca and Medina.

The King was also interested in oil exploration though and made concessions to several companies, allowing them to explore for oil in the Kingdom. Discovery! outlines how American oil officials agreed to share profits with the King, train employees, build roads and towns, and eventually turn Aramco into a Saudi run and owned company in return for revenue and exclusive oil rights.

Following several negotiations outlined in Stegner's book and especially with the help of ex-English intelligence officer and Muslim convert St. John Philby the American company and the Saudi King agreed to partner.

Stegner's book details the lives of some of the American families who were part of this oil exploration and the unique set of circumstances that they faced living in Saudi Arabia as well as the effect that these families and employees had on the native population of Saudi Arabia.

He also outlines the beginnings of a relationship between US business and the Kingdom of Saudi Arabia from the 1930s through the end of World War II.

== History of the book ==
The first manuscript was written by Stegner in 1956 and was submitted to Aramco shortly thereafter. According to Discovery!'s new introduction officials at the company were hesitant to publish the manuscript due to the political situation in the Middle East with the nationalization of the Suez Canal and the pan-Arabism of Gamal Abdel Nasser of Egypt. The manuscript remained unpublished until a company editor found it in 1967.

Stegner and Aramco compromised on the contents of the book and it began being published in serial form in Saudi Aramco World magazine in 1970. Stegner's hesitations on writing a public relations campaign for a company were included in the book as well as some of his critiques.

The book was released worldwide in September 2007 with additional annotations, a bibliography, an introduction by author and journalist Thomas Lippman and unreleased photographs.

== Controversy ==
Questions have arisen over Selwa Press' legal right to publish the book with Stegner's name attached. The dispute centers over whether a 1958 contract between the author and Aramco required Stegner's approval before his name could be used. Publisher Tim Barger said that Stegner had given that approval when the book was serialized in an Aramco magazine in the 1960s. The author also approved an Aramco-published book in 1971. But the author's former agent, Carl Brandt, who represents Stegner's estate, called the book "a bowdlerized version of what Wally wrote," and Stegner's son Page said that material critical of Aramco or considered offensive to the company's Saudi partners was removed. Stegner biographer Philip Fradkin said that Stegner was paid for his work and had accordingly permitted an Aramco-published version but did not want that version published as a trade book.

Stegner's original draft now resides at the University of Utah. Barger said that Aramco would never agree to the publication of Stegner's original draft.
