= Nuclear Information and Resource Service =

US anti-nuclear group

- Formation: 1978; 48 years ago
- Headquarters: Takoma Park, MD, United States
- Exec. Dir.: Tim Judson
- Website: Official website

The Nuclear Information and Resource Service (NIRS) is a 501(c)(3) non-profit anti-nuclear group founded in 1978. Its mission is to be an information and networking center for citizens and organizations concerned about nuclear power, radioactive waste, radiation and sustainable energy issues.

In 2000, NIRS' affiliation with World Information Service on Energy (WISE) turned it into an international organization (NIRS/WISE).

== International offices ==
NIRS and WISE have merged their operations and WISE has relay offices in Amsterdam, Argentina, Austria, the Czech Republic, India, Japan, Russia, Slovakia, South Africa, Sweden, and Ukraine.

Michael Mariotte (1952-2016) was president and executive director of the Nuclear Information and Resource Service for 30 years. He was a well-known opponent of nuclear power and organized anti-nuclear activities in Europe after the 1986 Chernobyl disaster. Mariotte was a keen supporter of renewable energy and efficient energy use. He believed that nuclear power would become obsolete, to be replaced by renewable energy sources.

== Press ==
On 3 August 2004, NIRS issued a report stating that the U.S. Nuclear Regulatory Commission may allow the illegal practice of manually shutting down nuclear power plants in the event of fire.

On 15 May 2007, NIRS issued a report claiming that radioactive scrap, concrete, equipment, asphalt, plastic, wood, chemicals, and soil from U.S. nuclear weapons facilities are being released to regular landfills and could get into commercial recycling streams."

On 17 July 2007, regarding the leakage of water from the spent fuel pool of the Kashiwazaki-Kariwa Nuclear Power Plant after the 2007 Niigata earthquake, Michael Mariotte, spoke on behalf of the NIRS and commented "The leak itself doesn't sound significant as of yet, but the fact that it went unreported is a concern, when a company begins by denying a problem, it makes you wonder if there's another shoe to drop."

The magazine Nuclear Engineering International has said that NIRS runs the best website on uranium mining throughout the world.

In October 2010, Michael Mariotte, then the executive director of NIRS, predicted that the U.S. nuclear industry will not experience a nuclear renaissance, for the simple reason that “nuclear reactors make no economic sense”. The economic slump has driven down electricity demand and the price of competing energy sources, and Congress has failed to pass climate change legislation, making nuclear economics very difficult.

== Controversy ==
Critics accuse NIRS of fearmongering and question the qualifications of NIRS staff to adequately assess the safety of nuclear energy. No NIRS staff member is credited with formal training in nuclear physics or engineering.

In a 2008 response to NIRS claims appearing on the website palmbeachpost.com, David Bradish of the Nuclear Energy Institute challenged a contention of NIRS Southeast Office Director Mary Olson that "A nuclear power plant takes so much water and energy to build, it has to run for 15 years to offset its carbon footprint." Citing data from the World Nuclear Association, Bradish argues "it is reasonable to say a nuclear plant takes about one year to offset its energy consumption from its other stages." At a 2006 talk before the United Nations Commission on Sustainable Development, Olson claimed that when full-lifecycle emissions are included "the release of carbon dioxide (CO2) as the result of making electricity from uranium is comparable to burning natural gas to make electric power."

== See also ==
- Anti-nuclear movement in the United States
- List of anti-nuclear protests in the United States
- Nuclear renaissance in the United States
- Paul Gunter
- Paxus Calta
- World Information Service on Energy
