= Politics of New England =

The New England region of the United States is shaded in red above.

The politics of New England has long been defined by the region's political and cultural history, demographics, economy, and its loyalty to particular U.S. political parties. Within the politics of the United States, New England is sometimes viewed in terms of a single voting bloc. All of the twenty-one congressional districts of the House of Representatives in New England are currently represented by Democrats. In the Senate, nine Democrats, two Independents (both of whom caucus with Democrats), and one Republican represent New England. In every presidential election since 2004, the Democratic candidate has won a plurality of votes in each New England state, making the region considerably more Democratic than the rest of the nation. However, there has never been a time since the Republican Party's founding in which it was completely shut out in the New England congressional delegations.

Same-sex marriage had been permitted in all New England states before the U.S. Supreme Court case Obergefell v. Hodges made it legal nationwide. Rhode Island was the final New England state to legalise the practice in May 2013.

The national U.S. movement against nuclear power had its roots in New England in the 1970s. In 1974, activist Sam Lovejoy toppled a weather tower at the site of the proposed Montague Nuclear Power Plant in Western Massachusetts. The movement "reached critical mass" with the arrests at Seabrook Station Nuclear Power Plant on May 1, 1977, when 1,414 anti-nuclear activists from the Clamshell Alliance were arrested at the Seabrook site. Harvey Wasserman, a Clamshell spokesman at Seabrook, and Frances Crowe of Northampton, an American Friends Service Committee member, played key roles in the movement.

== Notable laws and political movements ==
=== Abolition of slavery ===
New England played a pioneering role in the abolitionist movement. Notably, Samuel Sewall's The Selling of Joseph, published in Boston in 1700, is widely recognized as the first anti-slavery tract printed in English in North America. This early publication contributed to the region's developing stance against slavery, with Massachusetts effectively abolishing the practice by 1783, significantly earlier than many other states. Boston subsequently became a vital hub for the 19-century national anti-slavery movement, hosting the founding of the New England Anti-Slavery Society in 1832 and serving as the publication base for William Lloyd Garrison's influential newspaper The Liberator.

=== Abolition of the death penalty ===
The New England state of Rhode Island was one of the first states to abolish the death penalty, doing so in 1852. New Hampshire was the final New England state to outlaw the practice, doing so in 2019. Although New Hampshire currently has one death row inmate, it has not held an execution since 1939.

Connecticut and Rhode Island were the only states in the union not to ratify the Eighteenth Amendment to the United States Constitution, also known as prohibition.

New Hampshire has no seatbelt law for persons over 18 years of age, no helmet law for motorcyclists, no mandatory auto-insurance law, and has neither an income tax nor a sales tax.

Vermont, Maine and New Hampshire allow both the open and concealed carrying of a firearm without a permit.

Massachusetts passed a ballot initiative (question 3) in the November 2012 election that legalized medical marijuana, effective January 1, 2013. Only people with debilitating diseases such as cancer, Parkinson's disease, or Alzheimer's can obtain a medical marijuana card. Massachusetts became the 18th state in the US to legalize the medical use of marijuana. Similar laws are also in place in every state in New England aside from New Hampshire.

=== Same-sex marriage ===
Same-sex marriage had been legalized in all of the New England states: Connecticut, Maine, Massachusetts, New Hampshire, Rhode Island and Vermont, before it became legal nationwide in Obergefell v. Hodges. The New England region has been noted for being the center of the same-sex marriage movement in the United States, with the region having among the most widespread and earliest legal support of any region. In 2004, Massachusetts became the first state in the United States to legalize same-sex marriage, to be followed by three more states between October 2008 and June 2009. This followed Vermont being the first-in-the-nation with civil unions in 2000. Before the 2012 election, California (2008), Iowa (2009), New York (2011) and the District of Columbia (2010) had been the only U.S. jurisdictions outside New England to have performed same-sex marriages, though same-sex marriages in California had been halted following the passage of Proposition 8.

The legalization of same-sex marriage was part of a campaign which began in November 2008, called Six by Twelve, and was organized by the Gay & Lesbian Advocates & Defenders (GLAD) to legalize same-sex marriage in all six New England states by 2012.

The region holds a number of firsts on same-sex marriage: Vermont was the first state to enact it through legislative means and not because of a judicial ruling, and Maine was the first state to have a governor sign a same-sex marriage bill that was not the result of a court decision. However, this law was repealed through a people's veto (53% voted to ban it versus 47% who voted to legalize it), but three years later, on November 6, 2012, the question was put to voters a second time, and the electorate voted 53–47 in support of same-sex marriage. As a result, Maine became one of three first US states to approve same-sex marriage at the ballot box, along with Washington and Maryland.

With Rhode Island legalizing same-sex marriage, all New England states allowed the practice. There have been numerous reasons given for why New England has found such strong legal recognition for same-sex marriages in comparison to the rest of the United States, including low religiosity, high educational attainment, strong social libertarianism, a long history of open same-sex relationships (including Boston marriages), and a general independent streak in New England culture.

=== Anti-nuclear movement ===
There were four targets of the anti-nuclear movement since 1974. As a result, Montague Nuclear was cancelled. Yankee Rowe closed prematurely for engineering inadequacies. Vermont Yankee was closed because it became uncompetitive. Seabrook remains operational.

==== Montague Nuclear Power Plant ====
On February 22, 1974, Sam Lovejoy took a crowbar to the weather-monitoring tower which had been erected at the Montague Nuclear Power Plant site. Lovejoy fell 349 feet (106 m) from the 550 feet (170 m) tower. He turned himself in to the local police. He presented a statement in which he took responsibility for the action. Lovejoy's action galvanized local public opinion against the plant. The Montague nuclear power plant proposal was canceled in 1980, after $29 million was spent on the project.

==== Seabrook ====
Seabrook power plant was proposed as a twin-reactor plant in 1972, at an estimated cost of $973 million. It received a commercial license in March 1990 for one reactor which cost $6.5 billion. Over a period of thirteen years more than 4,000 citizens, many associated with the Clamshell Alliance anti-nuclear group, committed non-violent civil disobedience at Seabrook:

- August 1, 1976: 200 residents rallied at the future Seabrook Station Nuclear Power Plant site in New Hampshire, and 18 were arrested for criminal trespass.
- August 22, 1976: 188 activists from New England were arrested at the Seabrook site.
- May 2, 1977: 1,414 protesters were arrested at Seabrook Station Nuclear Power Plant. The protesters who were arrested were expected to be "released on their own recognizance", but this did not happen. Instead, they were charged with criminal trespass and asked to post bail ranging from $100 to $500. They refused and were then held in five national guard armories for 12 days. The Seabrook conflict, and role of New Hampshire Governor Meldrim Thomson, received much national media coverage.
- May 13, 1977: 550 protestors were freed after being detained for thirteen days.
- June 1978: some 12,000 people attended a protest at Seabrook.
- May 25–27, 1980: Police use tear gas, riot sticks and dogs to drive 2,000 demonstrators away from the Seabrook site.
- May 24, 1986: 74 anti-nuclear demonstrators were arrested in protests.
- October 17, 1988: 84 people were arrested at the Seabrook plant.
- June 5, 1989: hundreds of demonstrators protested against the plant's first low-power testing, and the police arrested 627 people for trespassing; two state legislators, one from Massachusetts and one from New Hampshire, protested.

==== Yankee Rowe ====
The New England Coalition (NEC) is an educational non-profit organization based in Brattleboro, Vermont. Historically, it has been part of the anti-nuclear movement in the United States. The NEC is primarily concerned with legal action more than protests. It was involved in both legal action and protests about the Yankee Rowe Nuclear Power Plant prior to its shut down in 1992, and has been involved in legal action and protests over extending the license to operate at the Vermont Yankee Nuclear Power Plant.

==== Vermont Yankee ====
In February 2010, the Vermont Senate voted 26 to 4 against allowing the PSB to consider re-certifying the Vermont Yankee Nuclear Plant after 2012, citing radioactive tritium leaks, misstatements in testimony by plant officials, a cooling tower collapse in 2007, and other problems. In January 2012, Entergy won a court case to invalidate the state's veto power on continued operation.

There were a number of anti-nuclear protests about Vermont Yankee since the 1970s. These included protests following the Japanese Fukushima nuclear disaster in March 2011 and on the date of the original operating license expiry in March 2012. On August 28, 2013, the company said economic factors, notably the low cost of electricity caused by cheap natural gas, would result in the company's decommissioning the plant in the fourth quarter of 2014.

== Attempts at secession ==
=== Hartford Convention ===
The Hartford Convention was a series of meetings dating from December 15, 1814, to January 5, 1815, taking place in Hartford, Connecticut. They were led by various New England leaders leaders of the Federalist Party, and discussed their grievances concerning the War of 1812 and the other political problems stemming from the federal government's increasing power. One of the most notable propositions during the Hartford Convention was the idea of secession from the United States.

=== The New England Independence Campaign ===
The New England Independence Campaign (NEIC) is a big tent political advocacy organization founded in 2014 by Alex Gilbert. They cite issues such as the unfair balance of payments between states like Connecticut and Massachusetts and the federal government as reason for secession. Other key platform issues include non-interventionism, political decentralization, reproductive rights, environmentalism, responsible gun ownership, and advocacy for electoral reform, including multi-party democracy and ranked voting. The NEIC has historically clashed with neo-Nazi groups like NSC-131. Despite being nominally non-partisan, it draws most of its support from progressives, libertarians, and moderates.

=== The Yankee National Party ===
The Yankee National Party is a center-left, social democratic party founded in 2023 by Joshua Steele-Kelly. Their platform centers around five core values: empathy, democracy, integrity, sustainability, and self-determination. They seek to uphold these values through community organizing, outreach and activism, and political advocacy. All party members and endorsed political candidates are expected to adhere to the YNP's code of ethics which center around these values.

The Yankee National Party asserts that the United States is composed of several smaller culturally distinct regions, with the New England region being one. They support taking steps toward New England's independence through the decentralization and devolution of Federal governance over individual states. Modeling themselves after the Scottish Independence Campaign and the Quebec Sovereignty Movement, the YNP maintains there is not only a legal and peaceful path to independence, but one which allows the region to uphold and honor its cultural values.

The Yankee National Party seeks to establish state-based chapters, and currently has active chapters in Connecticut and Rhode Island.

=== New England Autonomy ===
The New England Autonomy Movement (NEAM) is a political advocacy organization founded in 2024. Key platform issues include economic independence, reproductive rights, environmentalism, and advocacy for electoral reform, including multi-party democracy and ranked voting. The NEAM is a distinct organization, but shares significant membership with the NEIC. They believe in increasing state's autonomy, self-sufficiency, and infrastructure in anticipation of future attempts to achieve regional independence.

=== The People's Initiative of New England ===
The People's Initiative of New England (PINE) is a subgroup of the Nationalist Social Club-131 founded in July 2023. Although they cite more issues on their publications, they mainly focus on issues such as; the nuclear family, the fentanyl crisis, housing, ongoing immigration, and a depleting regional identity. Multiple sources have noted they engage in racism, antisemitism, homophobia, and transphobia within their rhetoric, including the Southern Poverty Law Center and the Anti-Defamation League. In February 2024, the group demonstrated in front of Governor Maura Healey's residence in response to civil charges filed by the Massachusetts Attorney General regarding the group's efforts to "disrupt public peace and safety".

== See also ==
- Elections in New England
- Politics of Vermont
- Politics of New Hampshire
- Politics of Maine
- Politics of Massachusetts
- Politics of Connecticut
- Politics of Rhode Island
