= World Information Service on Energy =

Anti-nuclear organization based in Amsterdam

World Information Service on Energy (WISE)
- Formation: 1978
- Headquarters: Amsterdam, The Netherlands
- Director: Peer de Rijk
- Website: https://www.wiseinternational.org/

The World Information Service on Energy (WISE) is an anti-nuclear group founded in 1978 as an information and networking center for citizens and organizations concerned about nuclear power, radioactive waste, radiation and sustainable energy issues. Since their founding, they have been based in Amsterdam, the Netherlands.

Their main activities include anti-nuclear campaigns and magazine publishing. They are also known for the design and distribution of the Smiling Sun badge, popular in the 1970s, which reads: "Nuclear Power? No Thanks."

== Magazine ==
Their English language magazine was first published in May 1978 and was titled WISE News Communique. In 1978, WISE also began publishing WISE Bulletin, which was multi-lingual. In 2002, WISE merged with the NIRS Monitor, which was published by the Nuclear Information and Resource Service (NIRS), and began co-producing a publication titled the Nuclear Monitor.
