= Elections in New England =

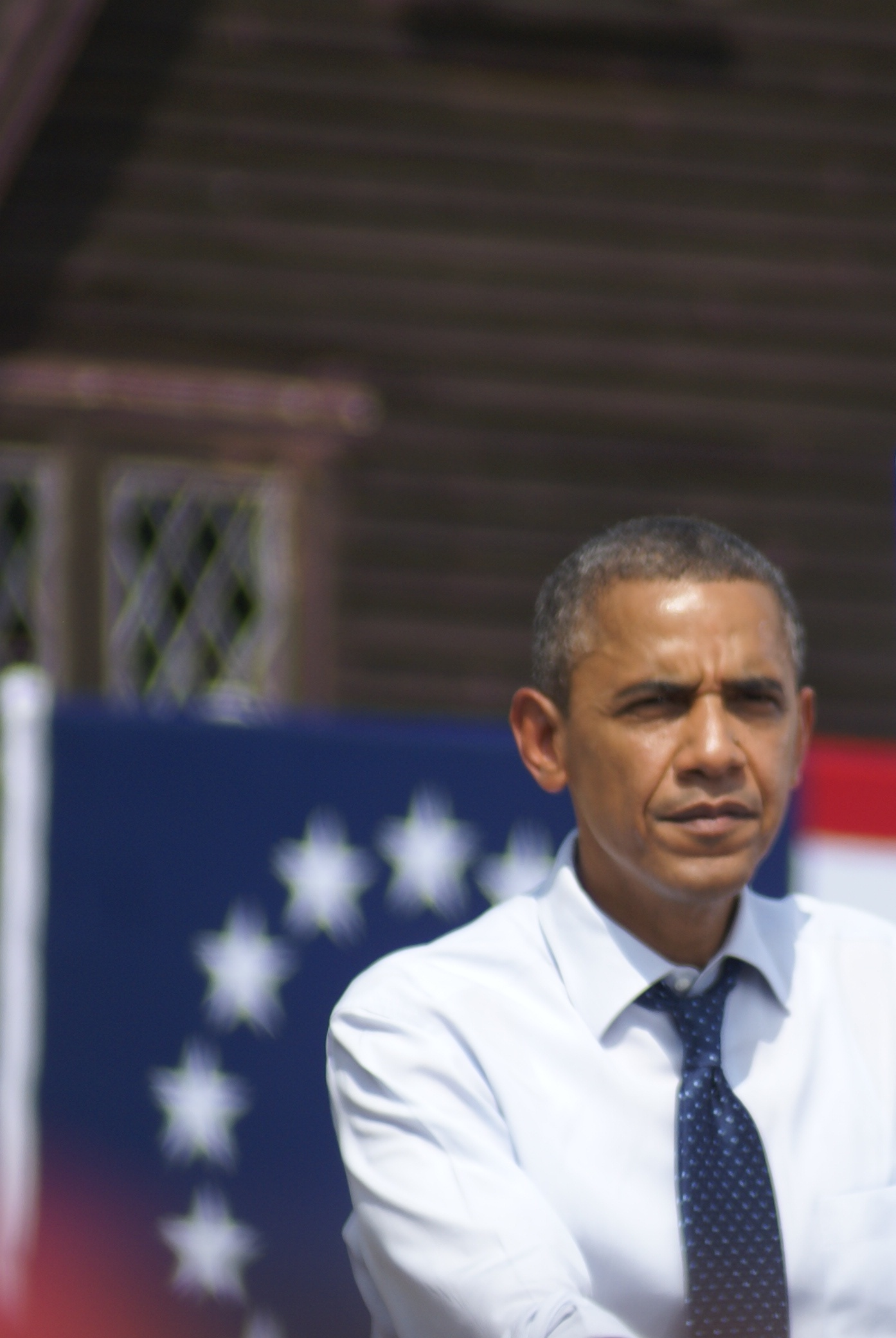
Barack Obama campaigning in Portsmouth, New Hampshire during his 2012 reelection bid in the 2012 US presidential election. He carried every New England state in 2008 and 2012.

Elections in New England have been defined by the region's political and cultural history, demographics, economy, and its loyalty to particular U.S. political parties. Within the elections in the United States, New England is sometimes viewed in terms of a single voting bloc.

== Presidential ==
Parties
Nonpartisan	Federalist	Democratic-Republican	National Republican	Democratic	Anti-Masonic	Whig	Republican

- **Bold** denotes election winner.

Presidential electoral votes in the New England states since 1789
Year	Connecticut	Maine	Massachusetts	New Hampshire	Rhode Island	Vermont
1789	**Washington**	Prior to 1820, modern-Maine was a part of Massachusetts	**Washington**	**Washington**	No election	No election
1792	**Washington**	Prior to 1820, modern-Maine was a part of Massachusetts	**Washington**	**Washington**	**Washington**	**Washington**
1796	**Adams**	Prior to 1820, modern-Maine was a part of Massachusetts	**Adams**	**Adams**	**Adams**	**Adams**
1800	Adams	Prior to 1820, modern-Maine was a part of Massachusetts	Adams	Adams	Adams	Adams
1804	Pinckney	Prior to 1820, modern-Maine was a part of Massachusetts	**Jefferson**	**Jefferson**	**Jefferson**	**Jefferson**
1808	Pinckney	Prior to 1820, modern-Maine was a part of Massachusetts	Pinckney	Pinckney	Pinckney	**Madison**
1812	Clinton	Prior to 1820, modern-Maine was a part of Massachusetts	Clinton	Clinton	Clinton	**Madison**
1816	King	Prior to 1820, modern-Maine was a part of Massachusetts	King	**Monroe**	**Monroe**	**Monroe**
1820	**Monroe**	**Monroe**	**Monroe**	**Monroe**	**Monroe**	**Monroe**
1824	**Adams**	**Adams**	**Adams**	**Adams**	**Adams**	**Adams**
1828	Adams	Adams	Adams	Adams	Adams	Adams
1832	Clay	**Jackson**	Clay	**Jackson**	Clay	Wirt
1836	**Van Buren**	**Van Buren**	Webster	**Van Buren**	**Van Buren**	Harrison
1840	**Harrison**	**Harrison**	**Harrison**	Van Buren	**Harrison**	**Harrison**
1844	Clay	**Polk**	Clay	**Polk**	Clay	Clay
1848	**Taylor**	Cass	**Taylor**	Cass	**Taylor**	**Taylor**
1852	**Pierce**	**Pierce**	Scott	**Pierce**	**Pierce**	Scott
1856	Frémont	Frémont	Frémont	Frémont	Frémont	Frémont
1860	**Lincoln**	**Lincoln**	**Lincoln**	**Lincoln**	**Lincoln**	**Lincoln**
1864	**Lincoln**	**Lincoln**	**Lincoln**	**Lincoln**	**Lincoln**	**Lincoln**
1868	**Grant**	**Grant**	**Grant**	**Grant**	**Grant**	**Grant**
1872	**Grant**	**Grant**	**Grant**	**Grant**	**Grant**	**Grant**
1876	Tilden	**Hayes**	**Hayes**	**Hayes**	**Hayes**	**Hayes**
1880	**Garfield**	**Garfield**	**Garfield**	**Garfield**	**Garfield**	**Garfield**
1884	**Cleveland**	Blaine	Blaine	Blaine	Blaine	Blaine
1888	Cleveland	**Harrison**	**Harrison**	**Harrison**	**Harrison**	**Harrison**
1892	**Cleveland**	Harrison	Harrison	Harrison	Harrison	Harrison
1896	**McKinley**	**McKinley**	**McKinley**	**McKinley**	**McKinley**	**McKinley**
1900	**McKinley**	**McKinley**	**McKinley**	**McKinley**	**McKinley**	**McKinley**
1904	**Roosevelt**	**Roosevelt**	**Roosevelt**	**Roosevelt**	**Roosevelt**	**Roosevelt**
1908	**Taft**	**Taft**	**Taft**	**Taft**	**Taft**	**Taft**
1912	**Wilson**	**Wilson**	**Wilson**	**Wilson**	**Wilson**	Taft
1916	Hughes	Hughes	Hughes	**Wilson**	Hughes	Hughes
1920	**Harding**	**Harding**	**Harding**	**Harding**	**Harding**	**Harding**
1924	**Coolidge**	**Coolidge**	**Coolidge**	**Coolidge**	**Coolidge**	**Coolidge**
1928	**Hoover**	**Hoover**	Smith	**Hoover**	Smith	**Hoover**
1932	Hoover	Hoover	**Roosevelt**	Hoover	**Roosevelt**	Hoover
1936	**Roosevelt**	Landon	**Roosevelt**	**Roosevelt**	**Roosevelt**	Landon
1940	**Roosevelt**	Willkie	**Roosevelt**	**Roosevelt**	**Roosevelt**	Willkie
1944	**Roosevelt**	Dewey	**Roosevelt**	**Roosevelt**	**Roosevelt**	Dewey
1948	Dewey	Dewey	**Truman**	Dewey	**Truman**	Dewey
1952	**Eisenhower**	**Eisenhower**	**Eisenhower**	**Eisenhower**	**Eisenhower**	**Eisenhower**
1956	**Eisenhower**	**Eisenhower**	**Eisenhower**	**Eisenhower**	**Eisenhower**	**Eisenhower**
1960	**Kennedy**	Nixon	**Kennedy**	Nixon	**Kennedy**	Nixon
1964	**Johnson**	**Johnson**	**Johnson**	**Johnson**	**Johnson**	**Johnson**
1968	Humphrey	Humphrey	Humphrey	**Nixon**	Humphrey	**Nixon**
1972	**Nixon**	**Nixon**	McGovern	**Nixon**	**Nixon**	**Nixon**
1976	Ford	Ford	**Carter**	Ford	**Carter**	Ford
1980	**Reagan**	**Reagan**	**Reagan**	**Reagan**	Carter	**Reagan**
1984	**Reagan**	**Reagan**	**Reagan**	**Reagan**	**Reagan**	**Reagan**
1988	**Bush**	**Bush**	Dukakis	**Bush**	Dukakis	**Bush**
1992	**Clinton**	**Clinton**	**Clinton**	**Clinton**	**Clinton**	**Clinton**
1996	**Clinton**	**Clinton**	**Clinton**	**Clinton**	**Clinton**	**Clinton**
2000	Gore	Gore	Gore	**Bush**	Gore	Gore
2004	Kerry	Kerry	Kerry	Kerry	Kerry	Kerry
2008	**Obama**	**Obama**	**Obama**	**Obama**	**Obama**	**Obama**
2012	**Obama**	**Obama**	**Obama**	**Obama**	**Obama**	**Obama**
2016	Clinton	Clinton^{[†]}	Clinton	Clinton	Clinton	Clinton
2020	**Biden**	**Biden**^{[†]}	**Biden**	**Biden**	**Biden**	**Biden**
2024	Harris	Harris^{[†]}	Harris	Harris	Harris	Harris
Year	Connecticut	Maine	Massachusetts	New Hampshire	Rhode Island	Vermont

In the 2000 presidential election, Democratic candidate Al Gore carried all of the New England states except for New Hampshire, and in 2004, John Kerry, a New Englander himself, won all six New England states. In both the 2000 and 2004 presidential elections, every congressional district with the exception of New Hampshire's 1st district were won by Gore and Kerry respectively. During the 2008 Democratic primaries, Hillary Clinton won the three New England states containing Greater Boston (Massachusetts, Rhode Island, and New Hampshire), while Barack Obama won the three that did not (Connecticut, Maine, and Vermont). In the 2008 presidential election, Obama carried all six states by 9 percentage points or more. He carried every county in New England except for Piscataquis County, Maine, which he lost by 4% to Senator John McCain (R-AZ). As of the 2010 census, New England collectively has 33 electoral votes.

The six states of New England voted for the Democratic Presidential nominee in the 1992, 1996, 2004, 2008, and 2012 elections, and every state but New Hampshire voted for Al Gore in the presidential election of 2000. In the 113th Congress the House delegations from all six states of New England are all Democratic. New England is home to the only two independent politicians currently serving in the U.S. Senate: Angus King, who represents Maine and Bernie Sanders, who represents Vermont.

=== New Hampshire primary ===
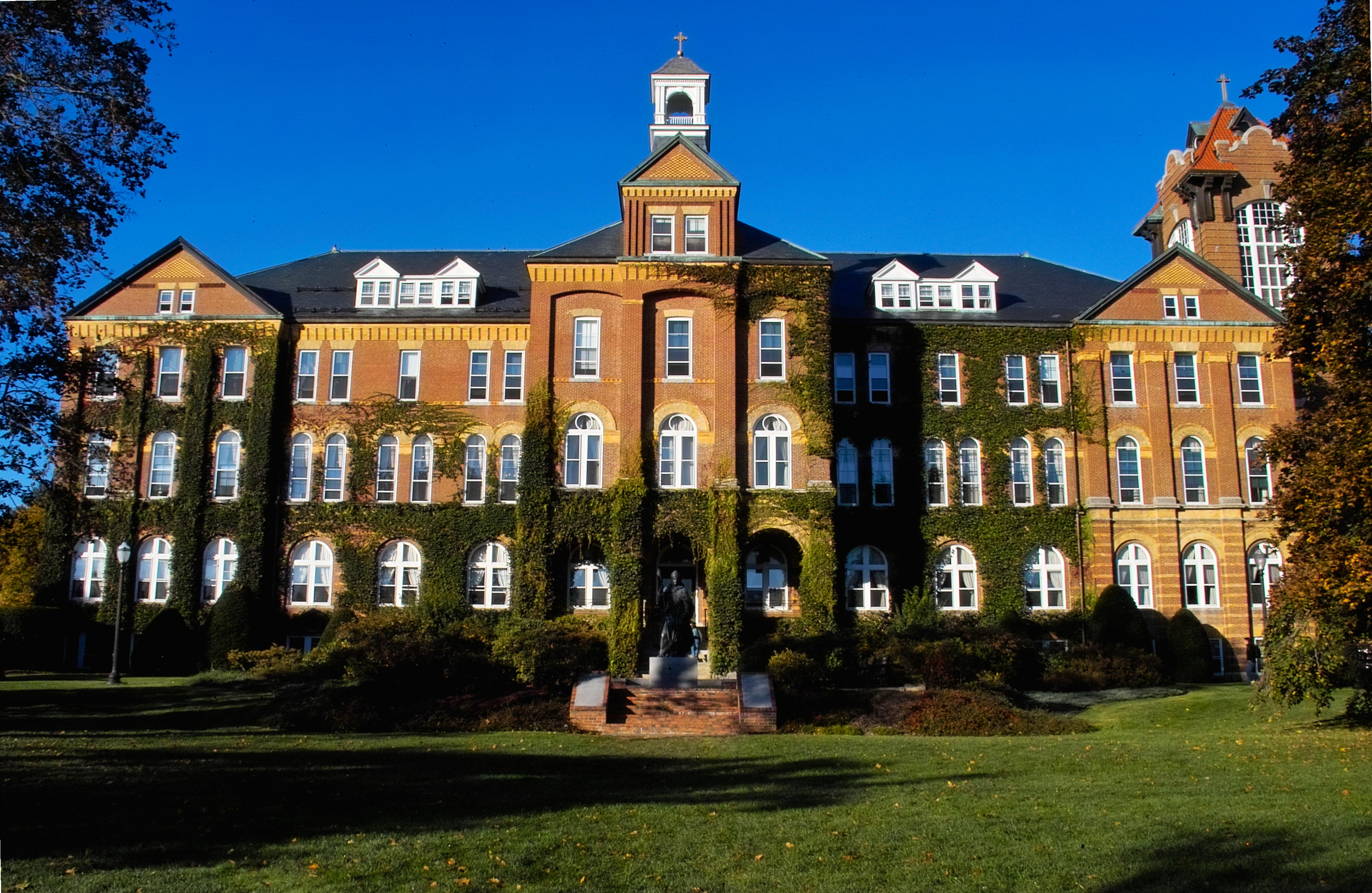
Alumni Hall at Saint Anselm College has served as a backdrop for the media reports during the New Hampshire primary.

Historically, the New Hampshire primary has been the first in a series of nationwide political party primary elections held in the United States every four years. Held in the state of New Hampshire, it usually marks the beginning of the U.S. presidential election process. Even though few delegates are chosen from New Hampshire, the primary has always been pivotal to both New England and American politics. One college in particular, Saint Anselm College, has been home to numerous national presidential debates and visits by candidates to its campus.

Local factories and diners are valuable photo opportunities for candidates, who hope to use this quintessential New England image to their advantage by portraying themselves as sympathetic to blue collar workers. Media coverage of the primary enables candidates low on funds to "rally back"; an example of this was President Bill Clinton who referred to himself as "The Comeback Kid" following the 1992 primary. National media outlets have converged on small New Hampshire towns, such as during the 2007 and 2008 national presidential debates held at Saint Anselm College in the town of Goffstown. Goffstown and other towns in New Hampshire have been experiencing this influx of national media since the 1950s.

== Political party strength ==
Judging purely by party registration rather than voting patterns, New England today is one of the most Democratic regions in the U.S., with four of the six states considered among the most solidly Democratic in the country. New Hampshire and Maine are generally swing states in federal elections. Republicans in New England are considered by both liberals and conservatives to be more moderate (even socially liberal) compared to Republicans in other parts of the U.S.

State	Governor	Senior U.S. Senator	Junior U.S. Senator	U.S. House Delegation	Upper House Majority	Lower House Majority
CT	N. Lamont	R. Blumenthal	C. Murphy	Democratic 5–0	Democratic 23–13	Democratic 97–54
ME	J. Mills	S. Collins	A. King^{[‡]}	Democratic 2–0	Democratic 22-13	Democratic 80–65-4-1-1
MA	M. Healey	E. Warren	E. Markey	Democratic 9–0	Democratic 37-3	Democratic 129–31
NH	K. Ayotte	J. Shaheen	M. Hassan	Democratic 2–0	Republican 16-8	Republican 221-177-1
RI	D. McKee	J. Reed	S. Whitehouse	Democratic 2–0	Democratic 33–5	Democratic 65-10
VT	P. Scott	B. Sanders^{[‡]}	P. Welch	Democratic 1–0	Democratic 16-13-1	Democratic 87-56-4-1-3

== See also ==
- Politics of New England
- Elections in Vermont
- Elections in New Hampshire
- Elections in Maine
- Elections in Massachusetts
- Elections in Connecticut
- Elections in Rhode Island

== Notes ==
^{†} Clinton, Biden and Harris won the overall state, but Donald Trump won Maine's 2nd congressional district in the 2016, 2020 and 2024 elections.
^{‡} Elected as an independent, but caucuses with the Democratic Party.
