= Philip L. Fradkin =

American environmentalist, historian, journalist, and author (1935–2012)

Philip L. Fradkin (1935–2012) was an American environmentalist, historian, journalist, and author. Fradkin authored books ranging from Alaska, California, and Nevada, with topics ranging from water conservation and earthquakes to nuclear weapons testing.

Fradkin was born to Jewish parents in Manhattan on February 28, 1935. His father, Leon Fradkin, was a dentist who had emigrated from the Russian Empire, and his mother, Elvira (nee Kush), was a writer and activist for nuclear disarmament and women's rights. Fradkin grew up in Montclair, New Jersey, where he attended Montclair Kimberley Academy, graduating in the class of 1953. When he was 14 years old, his father took him on an extended road trip through the Western United States. He fell in love with the American West, and subsequently moved to California in 1960.

In 1964, Fradkin began working for the Los Angeles Times, and the following year was part of the metropolitan staff awarded a Pulitzer Prize for its work on the 1965 Watts riots. In 2005, Fradkin was given the California Award by the Commonwealth Club of California.

He commented on controversial issues such as plagiarism allegations towards Wallace Stegner's Pulitzer Prize-winning novel, Angle of Repose, based on the letters of the American Old West author Mary Hallock Foote.

== Selected works ==
- California : the golden coast (1974) ISBN 0-670-19969-9
- A river no more : the Colorado River and the West (1981) ISBN 0-394-41579-5
- Fallout: An American Nuclear Tragedy (1989) ISBN 0-8165-1086-5
- Sagebrush country : land and the American West (1989) ISBN 0-394-52935-9
- Wanderings of an environmental journalist in Alaska and the American West (1993) ISBN 0-8263-1416-3
- The seven states of California : a natural and human history (1995) ISBN 0-8050-1947-2
- Magnitude 8 : earthquakes and life along the San Andreas Fault (1998) ISBN 0-8050-4696-8
- Wildest Alaska : journeys of great peril in Lituya Bay (2001) ISBN 0-520-22467-1
- Stagecoach : Wells Fargo and the American West (2002) ISBN 0-7432-1360-2
- The great earthquake and firestorms of 1906 : how San Francisco nearly destroyed itself (2005) ISBN 0-520-23060-4
- After the ruins, 1906 and 2006 : rephotographing the San Francisco earthquake and fire (2006) ISBN 0-520-24434-6
- Wallace Stegner and the American West (2008) ISBN 978-1-4000-4391-0
