= The Spectator Bird =

1976 novel by Wallace Stegner

- First edition cover
- Author: Wallace Stegner
- Language: English
- Publisher: Doubleday
- Publication date: 1976
- ISBN: 0-385-07890-0 (first edition)
- Dewey Decimal: 813.52

The Spectator Bird is a 1976 novel by Wallace Stegner. It won the National Book Award for Fiction in 1977, one of the two most prestigious literary awards in the United States.

The book tells the story of retired literary agent Joe Allston, who receives a postcard from an old friend, a Danish countess named Astrid. Joe initially hides the postcard from his wife, Ruth. However, he soon reveals to her not only its existence but that of a diary Joe kept twenty years before, when Joe and Ruth met Astrid while visiting Denmark. The Allstons took the trip in the wake of the death of their only child, Curtis, with whom Joe fought constantly.

Stegner moves the novel's narration back and forth between the present day, as Joe struggles with the physical and emotional degradations of older age, and Denmark, where Joe and Ruth get caught up in the strange, almost Gothic world of Astrid and her ostracized aristocratic family. It transpires that Joe became romantically involved with Astrid—to what degree Ruth hopes to find out—and still has unresolved feelings about her. The novel is both an intriguing, witty observation of Americans returning to the "old country" during post-World War II Europe, as well as a deep meditation on the blessings and frustrations of a long marriage.
