= Page Stegner =

American novelist

Stuart Page Stegner (January 31, 1937, in Salt Lake City, Utah, – December 14, 2017, in Reno, Nevada) was a novelist, essayist, and historian who wrote extensively about the American West. He was the son of novelist and historian Wallace Stegner.

== Career ==
Stegner received his B.A. in history from Stanford University in 1959, followed by a Ph.D. in American literature in 1964. He served as a professor of American Literature and Director of the creative writing program at the University of California, Santa Cruz from 1965 to 1995 at which time he focused his efforts on writing. He received a National Endowment for the Arts fellowship (1980), a National Endowment for the Humanities fellowship (1981) and a Guggenheim Fellowship (1982).

Stegner married Marion Lawrence Mackenzie in 1959. They had two children before divorcing. He later married novelist Lynn Stegner. He lived in Vermont in his later years.

== Selected writings ==
=== Non-fiction ===
- Escape Into Aesthetics, The Dial Press, c1966, Library of Congress Number 68–22588
- Nabokov's Congeries, The Viking Press, c1968, Library of Congross Catalogue Number 68–22868
- American Places, (with Wallace Stegner and Eliot Porter), E.P.Dutton, c1981, ISBN 0-525-05390-5
- Islands of the West, Sierra Club Books, c1985, ISBN 0-87156-844-6
- Outposts of Eden : a Curmudgeon at Large in the American West, Sierra Club Books, c1989, ISBN 0-87156-672-9
- Grand Canyon: The Great Abyss, Tehabi Books, c1995, ISBN 0-06-258573-8
- Winning the Wild West : the Epic Saga of the American Frontier, 1800-1899, foreword by Larry McMurtry, Tehabi Books, c2002 ISBN 0-7432-3291-7
- Adios, Amigos : Tales of Sustenance and Purification in the American West, Counterpoint, c2008, ISBN 1-59376-169-4

=== Fiction ===
- The Edge, The Dial Press, c1968, Library of Congress Catalog Number 67–25307
- Hawks and Harriers, The Dial Press, c1972, Library of Congress Catalog Number 75–163588
- Sportscar Menopause, Atlantic Little-Brown, c1977, ISBN 0-316-81224-2
