= Paul Gunter =

American anti-nuclear activist

Paul Gunter is a co-founder of the Clamshell Alliance anti-nuclear group, who was arrested at Seabrook Station Nuclear Power Plant for non-violent civil disobedience on several occasions. An energy policy analyst and activist, he has been a vocal critic of nuclear power for more than 30 years. Gunter worked as the Director of the Reactor Watchdog Project for Nuclear Information and Resource Service for almost 20 years. In 2007, Gunter joined Beyond Nuclear as their nuclear reactor specialist. He has made many national and international television, radio, and conference appearances and is quoted in the press.

In 2008, Gunter won the Jane Bagley Lehman Award from the Tides Foundation for outstanding achievements in "the fight against nuclear power".

== See also ==
- Anti-nuclear movement in the United States
- Anti-nuclear protests in the United States
