= Angle of Repose =

1971 novel by Wallace Stegner

- First edition cover
- Author: Wallace Stegner
- Language: English
- Publisher: Doubleday
- Publication date: 1971
- Publication place: United States
- Media type: Print (hardback & paperback)
- ISBN: 0-14-016930-X
- OCLC: 24953754
- Dewey Decimal: 813/.52 20
- LC Class: PS3537.T316 A8 1992

Angle of Repose is a 1971 novel by American novelist Wallace Stegner about a wheelchair-using historian, Lyman Ward, who has lost connection with his son and living family and decides to write about his frontier-era grandparents. It won the Pulitzer Prize for Fiction in 1972. The novel is directly based on the letters of Mary Hallock Foote, later published as A Victorian Gentlewoman in the Far West.

Stegner's use of substantial passages from Foote's actual letters as the correspondence of his fictional character Susan Burling Ward was and remains controversial among some scholars. While Stegner's defenders have claimed that he had received permission to use Foote's writings, as the book's acknowledgments page implies, others point out that he secured that permission only after falsely claiming that his novel would not use any direct quotations.

In 1998, the Modern Library ranked Angle of Repose #82 on its list of the 100 best English-language novels of the 20th century.

== Explanation of the novel's title ==
The title, seemingly taken from Foote's writings, is an engineering term for the angle at which soil finally settles after, for example, being dumped from a mine as tailings. It seems to describe the loose wandering of the Ward family as they try to carve out a civilized existence in the West and, Susan hopes, to return to the East as successes. The story details Oliver's struggles on various mining, hydrology, and construction engineering jobs, and Susan's adaptation to a hard life.

Another view has to do with a typical construction of canals and the drowning of Ward's daughter in a canal. Canal banks are sometimes simply piled mounds of dirt. Slanted walls of dirt are left at the angle of repose after the canal is built. Small disturbances to the dirt can cause it to slide down. Ward's daughter fell into a canal and couldn't climb out because of this.

== Plot summary ==
Lyman Ward narrates a century after the fact. Lyman interprets the story at times and leaves gaps that he points out at other times. Some of the disappointments of his life, including his divorce, color his interpretation of his grandparents' story. Toward the end of the novel, he gives up on his original ambition of writing a complete biography of his grandmother.

Stegner's use of Mary Hallock Foote's historical letters gives the novel's locations—Grass Valley, Leadville, New Almaden, Idaho, and Mexico—an authentic feel; the letters also add vividness to the Wards' struggles with the environment, shady businessmen, and politicians. Lyman's position in the contemporary culture of the late sixties provides another historical dimension to the story. Foils for this plot line include Lyman's adult son, a UC Berkeley-trained sociologist who sees little value in history, and a neighbor's daughter who helps transcribe Lyman's tape-recorded notes while she is home on summer break from UC Berkeley, where she has been active in the "hippie" counterculture movement.

== Fictional characters in Angle of Repose ==
=== Lyman Ward ===
58-year-old retired history professor Lyman Ward is the narrator of the book. He is a divorced amputee with a debilitating disease that is slowly "petrifying" him. The text of Angle of Repose is transcribed tapes of Ward dictating what is to become the biography of his grandmother, Susan Burling Ward. The dictation begins on April 12, 1970, and continues through the summer. Fiercely independent, Ward lives alone at the Zodiac Cottage, the house where his grandmother spent the last decades of her life and in which he spent time as a child. "Because of his disease and because his wife has abandoned him, [Ward] has reached a major crisis point in his life...His crisis leads him to the need to find a direction for his shattered life. That direction is provided by finding out about and trying to understand his grandparents..."

Aside from his scholarly work which consists of composing a biography from his grandmother's letters, published writings, and newspaper clippings, Ward spends his time on daily exercise, conversing with his summer secretary (Ada's daughter Shelly Rasmussen), and watching baseball with the Hawkes family. In addition, a major theme for Lyman Ward is fighting off intrusions into his life by his son, Rodman, and Rodman's wife who are skeptical of his self-reliance and, according to Ward, wish to send him to "...the retirement home in Menlo Park".

According to Jackson J. Benson, the character of Lyman Ward was modeled after Stegner's dissertation adviser at the University of Iowa, Norman Foerster, who also lost the use of his legs late in life due to disease.

=== Susan Burling Ward ===
In her youth, Susan Burling (the character based on Mary Hallock Foote) was a promising writer and artist connected with some of the leading lights in New York culture. When she and Oliver Ward met and fell in love, she left the promise of New York to follow him, expecting to return. The contrast between her life in the American West in the second half of the 19th century to that of her best friend in New York is a constant thread through the novel. Lyman depicts her as disappointed with her family's position in life, but a strong character able to adjust to the circumstances.

=== Oliver Ward ===
Based on Mary's husband Arthur De Wint Foote, Oliver is a bright, straightforward, honest man who has focused on supporting the family he loves. A mining engineer, he moves all over the West following jobs to Colorado, California, Mexico, and Idaho. Sometimes he is on his own, but when he feels he can, he has his family join him—often in the most primitive of homes in the wildest of places. His honesty limits his progress in the rough world they find themselves trying to succeed in. Lyman sees a struggle between this limitation and Susan's desire to recreate some of the "culture" of the East that she gave up upon her marriage, a desire that can only be fulfilled if her husband makes a great deal of money.

== Historical characters ==
The novel is thickly populated with real historical personages. A "Who's Who" of American geologists and other Western individuals of the late 19th century make their appearance, including John Wesley Powell, Clarence King, Samuel Franklin Emmons, Henry Janin, and Rossiter W. Raymond.

== Literary significance and criticism ==
Upon publication, Angle of Repose was praised nearly unanimously by critics for being both "...the most ambitious and deeply realized of [Stegner's] works" and on a larger scale, "...a major piece of literature". While some felt that Stegner did not make the meaning of Susan Burling Ward's story clear enough to Lyman Ward, most critics agreed that the characters, plot, and historical setting of Angle of Repose are well-realized. Even the slightly delayed review from The New York Times (most newspapers reviewed the book in April while the Times reviewed it in August) was just short of entirely positive, with the reviewer praising the novel with the reservation that "...I reached page 569 convinced that an essential element was absent". Despite this missing "element", most critics agree that Angle of Repose is "...one of the most important American novels of the twentieth century..."

The reputation of Angle of Repose remains strong among readers as well as critics. In 1999, readers of the San Francisco Chronicle voted it the best 20th-century novel written about the western United States.

Parts of the novel come from A Victorian Gentlewoman in the Far West: The Reminiscences of Mary Hallock Foote.

== Adaptations ==
The novel was adapted into an opera by Andrew Imbrie to a libretto by Oakley Hall, premiered by San Francisco Opera in 1976; Chester Ludgin created the role of Lyman Ward.

== Sources ==
- Benson, Jackson J. (2000). "Introduction". in Stegner, Wallace. Angle of Repose. New York: Penguin.
- DuBoisk, William (29 August 1971). "The Last Word: The Well-Made Novel". The New York Times. p. BR31.
- Fradkin, Philip L. (February 3, 2008). "A Classic, or A Fraud? Plagiarism allegations aimed at Stegner's Angle of Repose won't be put to rest". Los Angeles Times. sec. M, p. 8.
- Kipen, David (11 November 1999). "Acute 'Angle' Wins Reader Poll". San Francisco Chronicle. Accessed 02/23/2012.
- Kirsch, Robert (25 April 1971). "'Angle of Repose': Detailed Precisely". Los Angeles Times. p. U2.
- Kiser, Henry (6 April 1971). "Story-within-story gives genuine power to Stegner novel". Salt Lake City Tribune. p. 2E.
- Reynolds, Susan Salter (23 March 2003). "Tangle of Repose". Los Angeles Times. Accessed 1/31/2012.
- Reynolds, Susan Salter. "The power of his pen: Personal letters show the arrogant and affectionate sides of writer Wallace Stegner", Chicago Tribune, 12-15-07. Retrieved 2-19-09.
- Somervile, Richard (4 April 1971). "It is Life, History and Literature". Des Moines Sunday Register. p. 9T.
- Stegner, Wallace. (1971). Angle of Repose. New York: Penguin.
