= Wallace Stegner =

American historian, writer, and environmentalist

- Stegner c. 1969
- Born: Wallace Earle Stegner; February 18, 1909; Lake Mills, Iowa, U.S.
- Died: April 13, 1993 (aged 84); Santa Fe, New Mexico, U.S.
- Education: University of Utah (BA); University of Iowa (MA, PhD)
- Occupations: Historian; novelist; short story writer; environmentalist
- Spouse: Mary Stuart Page (1934–1993)
- Children: Page Stegner
- Writing career
- Period: 1937–1993
- Notable awards: Pulitzer Prize for Fiction (1972, Angle of Repose); National Book Award for Fiction (1977, The Spectator Bird); Fulbright Scholar to Greece, 1963

Wallace Earle Stegner (February 18, 1909 – April 13, 1993) was an American novelist, writer, environmentalist, and historian. He was often called "The Dean of Western Writers". He won the Pulitzer Prize in 1972 and the U.S. National Book Award in 1977.

== Personal life ==
Stegner was born in Lake Mills, Iowa, and grew up in Great Falls, Montana; Salt Lake City, Utah; and the village of Eastend, Saskatchewan, which he wrote about in his autobiography Wolf Willow. Stegner says he "lived in twenty places in eight states and Canada". He was the son of Hilda (née Paulson) and George Stegner. Stegner summered in Greensboro, Vermont. While living in Utah, he joined a Boy Scout troop at an LDS Church (although he himself was a Lutheran) and earned the rank of Eagle Scout.

He received a B.A. at the University of Utah in 1930. While at the University of Utah he was initiated into Sigma Nu fraternity. He was inducted into the Sigma Nu Hall of Honor at the 68th Grand Chapter in Washington D.C. He also studied at the University of Iowa, where he received a master's degree in 1932 and a doctorate in 1935.

In 1934, Stegner married Mary Stuart Page. For 59 years they shared a "personal literary partnership of singular facility," in the words of Arthur Schlesinger Jr. Stegner died in Santa Fe, New Mexico, on April 13, 1993, as the result of a car accident on March 28, 1993.

Stegner's son, Page Stegner, was a novelist, essayist, nature writer and professor emeritus at University of California, Santa Cruz. Page was married to Lynn Stegner, a novelist. Page co-authored American Places and edited the 2008 Collected Letters of Wallace Stegner. He was Thomas Heggen's cousin.

=== Activism ===
In the 1940s, Stegner was a leading member of the Peninsula Housing Association, a group of locals in Palo Alto aiming to build a large co-operative housing complex for Stanford University faculty and staff on a 260-acre ranch the group had purchased near campus. Private lenders and the Federal Housing Authority would not provide financing to the group because three of the families were African-American. The group abandoned the project and eventually sold the land rather than participate in a discriminatory housing complex.

== Career ==
Stegner taught at the University of Wisconsin and Harvard University. Eventually he settled at Stanford University, where he founded the creative writing program. His students included Wendell Berry, Sandra Day O'Connor, Edward Abbey, Simin Daneshvar, Andrew Glaze, George V. Higgins, Thomas McGuane, Robert Stone, Ken Kesey, Gordon Lish, Ernest Gaines, and Larry McMurtry. He served as a special assistant to Secretary of the Interior Stewart Udall and was elected to the Sierra Club's board of directors for a term that lasted 1964–1966. He also moved into a house near Matadero Creek on Three Forks Road in nearby Los Altos Hills and became one of the town's most prominent residents. In 1962, he co-founded the Committee for Green Foothills, an environmental organization dedicated to preserving and protecting the hills, forests, creeks, wetlands and coastal lands of the San Francisco Peninsula.

Stegner's novel Angle of Repose (first published by Doubleday in early 1971) won the Pulitzer Prize for Fiction in 1972. It was based on the letters of Mary Hallock Foote (first published in 1972 by Huntington Library Press as the memoir A Victorian Gentlewoman in the Far West). Stegner explained his use of unpublished archival letters briefly at the beginning of Angle of Repose but his use of uncredited passages taken directly from Foote's letters caused a continuing controversy.

In 1977 Stegner won the National Book Award for The Spectator Bird. In 1992, he refused a National Medal from the National Endowment for the Arts because he believed the NEA had become too politicized. Stegner's semi-autobiographical novel Crossing to Safety (1987) gained broad literary acclaim and commercial popularity.

Stegner's non-fiction works include Beyond the Hundredth Meridian: John Wesley Powell and the Second Opening of the West (1954), a biography of John Wesley Powell, the first white man to explore the Colorado River through the Grand Canyon. Powell later served as a government scientist and was an advocate of water conservation in the American West. Stegner wrote the foreword to and edited This Is Dinosaur, with photographs by Philip Hyde. The Sierra Club book was used in the campaign to prevent dams in Dinosaur National Monument and helped launch the modern environmental movement. A substantial number of Stegner's works are set in and around Greensboro, Vermont, where he lived part-time. Some of his character representations (particularly in Second Growth) were sufficiently unflattering that residents took offense, and he did not visit Greensboro for several years after its publication.

== Legacy ==
The Wallace Stegner Chair in Western American Studies at Montana State University was established to honor more than half a century of wisdom and commitment that novelist, historian, and conservationist Wallace Stegner contributed to the culture and society of the West. Stegner applauded the choice of Montana State University as the site of a chair in his name. “There’s an awakening in the rest of the country to the West and what it’s about,” he wrote shortly before his death in the spring of 1993. “And the West is waking up to itself. A chair in Western American Studies at MSU is a splendid way to inform the West about itself.”

On the occasion of the 100th anniversary of Stegner's birth, Timothy Egan reflected in The New York Times on the writer's legacy, including his perhaps troubled relationship with the newspaper itself. Over 100 readers including Jane Smiley offered comments on the subject.

External videos
- Tour of the Wallace Stegner Collection at the University of Utah's J. Willard Marriott Library, May 8, 2014, C-SPAN

In recognition of Stegner's legacy at the University of Utah, The Wallace Stegner Prize in Environmental or American Western History was established in 2010 and is administered by the University of Utah Press. This book publication prize is awarded to the best monograph the Press receives on the topic of American western or environmental history within a predetermined time period.

Lewis-Clark State College in Lewiston, Idaho, has a history of presenting an annual lecture titled after Stegner. The Wallace Stegner Lecture has long been a literary-cultural highlight for the LCSC community. The annual lecture features discussions about the writer's relationship with the physical and psychological territories in which he or she resides.

The Stegner Fellowship program at Stanford University is a two-year creative writing fellowship. The house Stegner lived in from age 7 to 12 in Eastend, Saskatchewan, Canada, was restored by the Eastend Arts Council in 1990 and established as a Residence for Artists; the Wallace Stegner Grant For The Arts offers a grant of $500 and free residency at the house for the month of October for published Canadian writers. In 2003, the indie rock trio Mambo Sons released the Stegner-influenced song "Little Live Thing / Cross to Safety" written by Scott Lawson and Tom Guerra, which resulted in an invitation for Lawson to serve as Artist-in-Residency for March 2009.

In 2005, the Los Altos History Museum mounted an exhibition entitled "Wallace Stegner: Throwing a Long Shadow" providing a retrospective of the author's life and works.

In May 2011, the San Francisco Chronicle reported that Stegner's Los Altos Hills home, which was sold in 2005, was scheduled to be demolished by the current owners. Lynn Stegner said the family attempted to sell the home to Stanford University in an attempt to preserve it, but the university said the home would be sold at market value, customary for real estate donated to Stanford. Wallace Stegner's wife, Mary, said that Wallace would disapprove of the fuss surrounding the issue. Wallace initially opposed the creation of a hiking path near his home but Mary Stegner confided that her husband later came to enjoy walking on it, and the path was eventually named for him posthumously, in 2008.

In August 2016 a public charter school called the Wallace Stegner Academy opened in Salt Lake City, Utah. The school was named after Wallace Stegner because the founders valued people like Stegner who are devoted to academics and pursue the advancement of knowledge and art throughout their entire lives.

The Wallace Earle Stegner papers (Ms0676), 1935–2004, can be found at the University of Utah Marriott Library Special Collections Manuscripts Division. With 29 boxes and 139 linear feet, the collections contains personal and professional correspondence, journals, manuscript drafts for work both published and unpublished, research material, memorabilia, scrapbooks, books containing letters of condolence compiled by Mary Stegner, and Wallace's personal typewriter.

The Wallace Stegner Research Collection: 1942–1996, Collection 2443, can be found at the Montana State University Archives and Special Collections in Bozeman, Montana. This collection of published materials and correspondence by and about Stegner was compiled by Nancy Colberg, a librarian and the author of Wallace Stegner: A Descriptive Bibliography and former owner of Willow Creek Books in Denver, Colorado. The materials were sold to the Archives in 2001. The collection contains Stegner articles and short stories from newspapers and periodicals, published interviews and articles about Stegner and his work, and personal and professional correspondence. A smaller collection of materials relating to Stegner gathered by Thomas H. Watkins was later added to Collection 2443. The collection is divided into four series with a total of 7 boxes or 3.2 linear feet.

== Bibliography ==
Novels

- Remembering Laughter (1937)
- The Potter's House (1938)
- On a Darkling Plain (1940)
- Fire and Ice (1941)
- The Big Rock Candy Mountain (1943), semi-autobiographical
- Second Growth (1947)
- The Preacher and the Slave (1950), reissued as Joe Hill: A Biographical Novel
- A Shooting Star (1961)
- All the Little Live Things (1967)
- Joe Hill: A Biographical Novel (1969)
- Angle of Repose (1971), winner of the Pulitzer Prize
- The Spectator Bird (1976), winner of the National Book Award
- Recapitulation (1979)
- Crossing to Safety (1987)

Collections

- The Women on the Wall (1950)
- The City of the Living: And Other Stories (1957)
- Writer's Art: A Collection of Short Stories (1972)
- One Way to Spell Man: Essays with a Western Bias (1982)
- The American West as Living Space (1987)
- Collected Stories of Wallace Stegner (1990)
- Late Harvest: Rural American Writing (1996), with Bobbie Ann Mason

Chapbooks

- Genesis: A Story from Wolf Willow (1994)

Nonfiction

- Clarence Edward Dutton: An Appraisal (1936)
- Mormon Country (1942, American Folkways series)
- One Nation (1945), with the editors of Look magazine
- Beyond the Hundredth Meridian: John Wesley Powell and the Second Opening of the West (1954)
- Wolf Willow: A History, a Story, and a Memory of the Last Plains Frontier (1962), autobiography
- Wilderness Letter (1960) (Note: According to Utah Gov. Huntsman in 2009, Wilderness Letter helped win passage of the Wilderness Act in 1964. See also the Timeline of environmental events and the full text of the letter at The Wilderness Society Web site. Retrieved 2-24-09.)
- The Gathering of Zion: The Story of the Mormon Trail (1964)
- Teaching the Short Story (1966)
- The Sound of Mountain Water (1969)
- Discovery! The Search for Arabian Oil (1971)
- The Uneasy Chair: A Biography of Bernard DeVoto (1974)
- Writer in America (1982)
- Conversations with Wallace Stegner on Western History and Literature (1983)
- This Is Dinosaur: Echo Park Country and its Magic Rivers (1985)
- American Places (1985)
- On the Teaching of Creative Writing (1988)
- Where the Bluebird Sings to the Lemonade Springs: Living and Writing in the West (1992), autobiographical

Short Stories

- "Bugle Song" (1938)
- "Chip Off the Old Block" (1942)
- "Hostage" (1943)

== Awards ==
- 1937 Little Brown Prize for Remembering Laughter
- 1945 Houghton-Mifflin Life-in-America Award and the Anisfield-Wolf Book Award for One Nation
- 1950–1951 Rockefeller fellowship to teach writers in the Far East
- 1953 Wenner-Gren Foundation grant
- 1956 Center for Advanced Study in the Behavioral Sciences fellowship
- 1967 Commonwealth Club Gold Medal for All the Little Live Things
- 1972 Pulitzer Prize for Fiction for Angle of Repose
- 1976 Commonwealth Club Gold Medal for The Spectator Bird
- 1977 National Book Award for Fiction for The Spectator Bird
- 1980 Los Angeles Times Kirsch award for lifetime achievement
- 1990 P.E.N. Center USA West award for his body of work
- 1991 California Arts Council award for his body of work
- 1991 Golden Plate Award of the American Academy of Achievement
- 1992 National Endowment for the Arts (refused)

Plus: Three O. Henry Awards, twice a Guggenheim Fellow (1949 and 1959,) Senior Fellow of the National Institute of Humanities, member of National Institute and American Academy of Arts and Letters, member National Academy of Art and Sciences.

The Encyclopedia of World Biography reports that the Little Brown prize was for "$2500, which at that time was a fortune. The book became a literary and financial success and helped gain Stegner [the] position ... at Harvard."
