= Fallout: An American Nuclear Tragedy =

1989 book by Philip L. Fradkin

- Author: Philip L. Fradkin
- Subject: Nuclear fallout
- Publisher: University of Arizona Press
- Publication date: 1989
- Pages: 300
- ISBN: 978-0-8165-1086-3

Fallout: An American Nuclear Tragedy is a 1989 book by Philip L. Fradkin which was republished in a second edition in 2004. The book is about the radiation exposure of people and their livestock living downwind from the nuclear weapons testing at the Nevada Test Site in the 1950s. The case of Irene Allen et al. vs. the United States is used as a framework for the narrative. The court case "resulted in an award of $2.66 million in damages to eight persons with leukemia, one with thyroid cancer, and another with breast cancer".

Philip Fradkin is an American environmentalist historian and journalist. Fradkin shared a Pulitzer Prize awarded to the metropolitan staff of the Los Angeles Times for coverage of the Watts riots in 1965.

== See also ==
- Alvin C. Graves
- List of books about nuclear issues
- Nuclear fallout
