= Lynn Stegner =

American author

Lynn Stegner is an American author.

Her 2007 novel Because a Fire Was in My Head won the Faulkner Award for Best Novel.

She was married to Page Stegner.

== Books ==
- Undertow (Baskerville Publishers, 1993)
- Fata Morgana (Baskerville Publishers, 1995)
- Pipers at the Gates of Dawn (University Press of New England, 2000)
- Because a Fire Was in My Head (University of Nebraska Press, 2007)
