= Alliance for Nuclear Accountability =

The Alliance for Nuclear Accountability (ANA) is a network of local, regional and national organizations working collaboratively on issues of nuclear weapons production and waste cleanup. Many of the local groups live downwind and downstream of the United States nuclear weapons complex sites. The member organizations are watchdogs of the Department of Energy nuclear weapons and energy programs. It was founded in 1987, under the name Military Production Network. In 1997 the name was changed to the Alliance for Nuclear Accountability.

In 2023, ANA stakeholders met with the U.S. Office of Environmental Management. During its annual Alliance for Nuclear Accountability (ANA) DC Days, ANA members meet with government administration officials and members of Congress to discuss nuclear weapons related health, cleanup and weapons issues.

== Member organizations ==
Organization	City	State	Primary focus	Website
Beyond Nuclear	Takoma Park	Maryland	nuclear power & weapons	beyondnuclear.org
Blue Ridge Environmental Defense League	North Myrtle Beach	North Carolina	earth stewardship, environmental democracy, social justice, and community empowerment	bredl.org
Colorado Coalition for the Prevention of Nuclear War	Denver	Colorado	nuclear disarmament	coloradocoalition.org
Concerned Citizens for Nuclear Safety	Santa Fe	New Mexico	effects of radioactive and other hazardous materials	nuclearactive.org
Fernald Residents for Environmental Safety and Health (FRESH)	Ross	Ohio	clean up the Fernald Feed Materials Production Center, which made uranium pits for nuclear weapons, 1951-1989	
Georgia Women’s Action for New Directions (WAND)	Atlanta	Georgia	climate and social justice	gawand.org
Hanford Challenge	Seattle	Washington	environment: Hanford cleanup, working for transparency including empowering whistleblowers	hanfordchallenge.org
Healing Ourselves and Mother Earth (HOME)	North Bennington	Vermont	environment	h-o-m-e.org
Healthy Environment Alliance of Utah (HEAL Utah)	Salt Lake City	Utah	environment	HealUtah.org
Heart of America Northwest	Seattle	Washington	environment esp. re. the Handford Nuclear Reservation	hanfordcleanup.org
JustPeace	Dallas	Texas	antiwar	
Miamisburg Environmental Safety & Health	Springsoro	Ohio	environment esp. re. Mound Nuclear Weapons Facility.	
Nuclear Age Peace Foundation	Santa Barbara	California	nuclear disarmament	wagingpeace.org
Nuclear Watch New Mexico	Santa Fe	New Mexico	nuclear power & weapons	nukewatch.org
Nuclear Watch South	Atlanta	Georgia	environment, esp. Savannah River Site	nonukesyall.org
Oak Ridge Environmental Peace Alliance	Oak Ridge	Tennessee	environment esp. re. Oak Ridge National Laboratory	orepa.org
Parents Against Santa Susana Field Lab	Brandeis	California	nuclear waste storage	https://parentsagainstssfl.com/
Peace Action	(nationwide)	(US)	Peace & Justice	peaceaction.org
Peace Farm	Amarillo	Texas	nuclear weapons including Pantex	peacefarm.us
PeaceWorks Kansas City	Kansas City	Missouri	nuclear weapons and environment esp. re. Kansas City Plant	peaceworkskc.org
Physicians for Social Responsibility	(nationwide)	(US)	nuclear weapons and environment	psr.org
Physicians for Social Responsibility – Kansas City	Kansas City	Kansas	nuclear weapons and environment	kansas.psr.org
Physicians for Social Responsibility - Los Angeles	Los Angeles	California	nuclear weapons and environment	https://www.psr-la.org/
PRESS (Portsmouth/Piketon Residents for Environmental Safety and Security)	Portsmouth	Ohio	nuclear weapons and social justice	
Rocky Mountain Peace & Justice Center	Boulder	Colorado	nuclear weapons and social justice	rmpjc.org
Savannah River Site Watch	Columbia	South Carolina	nuclear energy	https://srswatch.org/
Snake River Alliance	Boise	Idaho	nuclear energy	snakeriveralliance.org
Southern Alliance for Clean Energy	Knoxville	Tennessee	nuclear and renewable energy	https://cleanenergy.org/
Southwest Research and Information Center	Albuquerque	New Mexico	environment and social justice	sric.org
Tri-Valley Communities Against a Radioactive Environment (Tri-Valley CAREs)	Livermore	California	nuclear weapons and environment	trivalleycares.org
Women's Action for New Directions (WAND)	Arlington	Massachusetts	nuclear weapons and social justice	wand.org
Women’s International League for Peace and Freedom (WILPF)	(international)		nuclear weapons and social justice	wilpf.org
