= Waterfront dispute =

Waterfront dispute may refer to:

- 1951 New Zealand waterfront dispute
- 1998 Australian waterfront dispute
- 2012 Auckland waterfront dispute
