= Chris Corrigan =

Australian businessman

Chris Corrigan is an Australian businessman. He was the managing director of the Patrick Corporation until it was taken over in 2006.

Born in country New South Wales, he was educated at Bowral High School, the Australian National University and Harvard University. In the US he developed an interest in marketing and media and acquired new techniques in retail finance, including margin lending, which he introduced to Australia.

He joined stockbroker Ord Minnett as an analyst in 1968 and moved to BT Australia as investment manager in 1970. He was appointed managing director in 1979. Corrigan formed a partnership with Peter Scanlon, a former Elders executive, in 1990 when he set up an investment and management services business that first became the Lang Corporation and later stevedore company Patrick Corporation.

Corrigan is best known for the 1998 Australian waterfront dispute, in which he attempted to sack the heavily unionised workforce and replace it with strikebreakers, eventually leading to reform and restructuring of dockyard labour practices. In the 2007 miniseries Bastard Boys about the dispute, Corrigan was played by Geoff Morrell.

In 2007, Corrigan became non-executive chairman of companies associated with KFM Diversified Infrastructure and Logistics Fund which became Qube Holdings. The companies have bought into joint ventures in some of the stevedoring, wharf and shipping operations acquired by DP World when it took over P&O Transport Australia.
