= Bastard Boys =

2007 Australian miniseries

- Written by: Sue Smith
- Directed by: Raymond Quint
- Starring: Jack Thompson; Colin Friels; Dan Wyllie; Geoff Morrell; Rhys Muldoon; Anthony Hayes; Daniel Frederiksen; Justin Smith
- Country of origin: Australia
- Original language: English
- No. of episodes: 4

Production
- Executive producers: Miranda Dear; Scott Meek
- Producers: Brett Popplewell; Ray Quint
- Running time: 55 minutes
- Production company: Flying Cabbage Productions Pty Ltd

Original release
- Network: Australian Broadcasting Corporation
- Release: 13 May – 14 May 2007

Bastard Boys is an Australian television miniseries broadcast on ABC Television in 2007. It tells the story of the 1998 Australian waterfront dispute.

== Plot ==
The series tells the story of the waterfront dispute, when businessman Chris Corrigan and the Liberal government at the time illegally dismissed the unionised workforce. The story is related from four perspectives: "Greg's War", from the point of view of union leader Greg Combet; "Josh's War", from the point of view of lawyer Josh Bornstein; "Sean's War", from the point of view of dock worker Sean McSwain; and "Chris' War", from the point of view of Patrick Stevedores managing director Corrigan.

== Cast ==
- Daniel Frederiksen as Greg Combet
- Justin Smith as Josh Bornstein
- Anthony Hayes as Sean McSwain
- Geoff Morrell as Chris Corrigan
- Rhys Muldoon as Julian Burnside, QC
- Francis Greenslade as Bill Kelty
- Mike Bishop as Peter Reith
- Jack Thompson as Tony Tully
- Dan Wyllie as Brendan Tully
- Lucy Bell as Petra Hilsen
- Colin Friels as John Coombs
- Deborah Kennedy as Gwen Coombs
- Christopher Widdows as Garry Coombs
- Caroline Craig as Tali Bernard
- Justine Clarke as Janine McSwain
- Jeremy Kewley as Frank Parry
- Kevin Harrington as Derek Corrigan
- Helen Thomson as Valerie Corrigan
- Anna Lise Phillips as Cherie Snape
- Michele Fawdon as Lyn Tully
- Louis Corbett as Joe Corrigan
- Richard Heath as Podge

== Episodes ==
No.	Title	Directed by	Written by	Original release date
1	"Greg's War"	Ray Quint	Sue Smith	13 May 2007
In November 1997, the National Secretary of the Maritime Union of Australia (MUA), John Coombs, receives a mysterious phone call warning him of a top secret plan to remove union members from the waterfront. John calls upon Greg Combet, Assistant Secretary of the Australian Council of Trade Unions (ACTU) for support. Suspecting the government is somehow involved, they devise a three-pronged strategy to fight back. The union wins round one! Then, out of the blue, the wharfies are locked out of Patrick Stevedores' berths at Melbourne's Webb Dock. With John in Sydney, Greg must try to salvage the situation. It will be a long, hard fight ahead.
2	"Josh's War"	Ray Quint	Sue Smith	13 May 2007
Young up-and-coming lawyer Josh Bornstein is outraged by the events taking place on the docks in Melbourne and offers his services pro-bono to Greg Combet and the union movement. Amazed to discover Greg hasn't finalised any sort of legal strategy yet, Josh urges a radical new approach - don't wait to be attacked. Attack first. Take the company and possibly even the government to court for conspiracy. It's visionary and scary! Josh and the team engage in a race against time to try to forestall what they know is now imminent - the mass sacking of Patrick's entire unionised workforce. But literally hours before they're due in court, the event they've all been dreading takes place. In the dead of night, three days before Easter, security guards with batons and dogs march MUA members off the Patrick docks around the country. Before it is over, the entire country will be divided.
3	"Sean's War"	Ray Quint	Sue Smith	14 May 2007
Dock worker Sean McSwain is elected as the State Representative for the MUA, just as non-union labour begins working on Berth 5 at Patrick's Webb Dock in Melbourne. It becomes his responsibility to run the protest at the Melbourne docks. It is a mission that will test everything he has as an organiser, a mate, and a man. This forces Sean directly up against Tony Tully, a second-generation wharfie, who is used to the Union's old ways of fighting. Angry at the no-violence rule, he and his son Brendan are not the only ones who believe the Union's gone soft. But secretly, Tony is scared of the changes looming. Fear makes him lash out with dire consequences.
4	"Chris's War"	Ray Quint	Sue Smith	14 May 2007
Chris Corrigan is the Managing Director of Patrick Stevedores. He pits his will, strength and determination against the full resources of the labour movement, the media, the banks and, increasingly, the public, as Australian sentiment swings in behind the Union. The Federal Court brings down its finding in favour of the Union: Patrick Stevedores must reinstate its sacked workers as soon as possible. Corrigan finds himself cornered - his wife Valerie and family are receiving obscene and threatening phone calls; he is forced to stay under constant security surveillance; to travel only in the security of a laundry van. He appeals against the decision.

== Production ==
A retrospective from the ABC on the real dispute.

Most of the characters portrayed are real individuals, many of whom were interviewed in the process of writing the drama. However, a number of characters were invented and events were considerably compressed for dramatic purposes. Notably, the waterside workers portrayed in the drama were composites, based on interviews with many waterside workers.

Another example of invention was the placing of lawyer Josh Bornstein at a key protest, which would have been illegal because of a court injunction

== Release and home media ==
Bastard Boys was broadcast on ABC1 in May 2007.

The series was later issued by ABC and Roadshow Entertainment in their "Masters collection" as a two-DVD set (220 mins), packaged with the tele-film Curtin (93 mins) as a third disc.

== Reception ==
The Age's Debi Enker described it as a "thoughtful, illuminating and superbly cast account of a seminal event in our recent history [which] represents exactly the kind of drama that one would want the national broadcaster to nurture."

=== Partisan criticism ===
In 2006 Liberal Senator Concetta Fierravanti-Wells, while the series was still in production, called it wasteful spending and criticised it as "anti-government, pro-left propaganda". Journalist Michael Duffy described the series as pro-union propaganda. Chris Corrigan, who was involved in the dispute and attempted to sack the unionised workforce and replace it with strikebreakers, was highly critical of the series. Then-Prime Minister John Howard also labelled the series "political propaganda", saying that it ignored the notorious inefficiency of the Australian waterfront and years of collaborative failures to change this.

Criticism also came from some members of the union movement. According to Phillip Adams, unionist Bill Kelty was concerned that "no researcher, writer or producer - spoke to him about the dispute or his role in it. Yet they haven't hesitated to put words into their Kelty's mouth that the original Kelty never said". Chris Corrigan's brother Derek Corrigan has disputed claims that the broadcasting of Bastard Boys was timed to support Greg Combet's run for politics".

== Accolades ==
The script, published by Currency Press, won the 2007 Queensland Premier's Literary Award for Best Television Script.

The film received seven nominations in the 2007 Australian Film Institute Awards, including Best Telefeature or Mini Series and Best Direction in Television with Sue Smith winning Best Screenplay and Paddy Reardon winning Outstanding Achievement in Television Screen Craft.

== See also ==
- List of Australian television series
