= Mohammad El Halabi =

Palestinian former aid worker convicted of aiding Hamas (born 1978)

Mohammed El Halabi
- Born: 1978 (age 47–48); Jabalia Camp, Gaza Strip
- Education: Islamic University of Gaza
- Occupation: Aid worker
- Status: Released 1 February 2025 in the Israel–Hamas hostage and prisoner exchange; appeal suspended by the Supreme Court of Israel in March 2026
- Convictions: 15 June 2022, Beersheba District Court
- Criminal charges: Membership in a terrorist organization; financing terrorism; diverting humanitarian aid to Hamas; possession of a weapon
- Penalty: 12 years' imprisonment

Mohammed El Halabi (born 1978) is a Palestinian former aid worker who served as the Gaza director of the Christian charity World Vision International. In 2022 the Beersheba District Court convicted him of membership in Hamas, financing terrorism and diverting humanitarian aid and materials to the group's military wing, the Izz ad-Din al-Qassam Brigades, and sentenced him to 12 years in prison. The court found that Halabi had been recruited by Hamas's military wing in 2004 and placed in World Vision to gain influence inside an international organization, and that he diverted construction materials and funds to Hamas for tunnel building.

Halabi was released to Gaza on 1 February 2025 as one of the Palestinian prisoners freed in exchange for Israeli hostages under the 2025 Gaza war ceasefire. In February 2026, declassified internal documents of Hamas's Ministry of Interior and National Security, published by the Israeli research institute NGO Monitor, recorded that Halabi had been in contact with Qassam Brigades members and that Hamas had worked to obstruct his trial by intimidating potential witnesses and blocking World Vision employees from leaving Gaza to testify.

The case was contested throughout by World Vision, which commissioned an audit that it said found no missing funds, and by the United Nations human-rights experts and Amnesty International, who objected to the trial's reliance on classified evidence and closed hearings. Halabi has continued to deny any connection to Hamas.

== Early life and career ==
Halabi was born in 1978 in the Jabalia refugee camp, to which his family had fled during the 1947–1949 Palestine war. His father, Khalil, worked for UNRWA in Gaza. Halabi studied engineering at the Islamic University of Gaza, where he was a member of the Fatah student club. He married in 2003 and has five children. In 2004 he left engineering for aid work, and joined World Vision in 2005, eventually becoming manager of its Gaza operations.

== Arrest and investigation ==
Halabi was arrested by the Shin Bet on 15 June 2016 at the Erez Crossing while returning to Gaza. On 4 August 2016, Israel indicted him, alleging that over a period of years he had diverted World Vision funds and materials—which the Shin Bet put at tens of millions of dollars—to Hamas, using fictitious humanitarian projects and agricultural associations as cover. During his interrogation Halabi confessed, including to an undercover informer placed with him; his defence later argued the confession was coerced.

World Vision suspended its Gaza operations after the arrest and denied the allegations. Its Australian chief executive, Tim Costello, argued that the sums cited by the Shin Bet exceeded the charity's entire Gaza budget of roughly $22.5 million over the preceding decade, and that Halabi's signing authority had been capped at $15,000. The Australian Government, World Vision's largest donor in Gaza, suspended its funding to the charity's Gaza programme. A review by the Australian Department of Foreign Affairs and Trade, completed in March 2017, and a forensic audit commissioned by World Vision and led by lawyer Brett Ingerman, completed in July 2017, both reported finding no evidence that funds had been diverted. World Vision did not publish the audit.

== Trial ==
Halabi was tried before the Beersheba District Court. Because much of the prosecution's evidence was classified, most hearings were held behind closed doors and the proceedings ran for six years and more than 160 sessions. Halabi maintained his innocence and refused several plea offers. His lawyers, Maher Hanna and Jonathan Kuttab, argued that the case rested on secret evidence and a coerced confession, and that the original record of the confession had been lost.

=== Verdict and sentence ===
On 15 June 2022, the court convicted Halabi on all counts but one, including membership in a terrorist organisation, financing terrorism and possession of a weapon. In its 254-page ruling, most of which remains classified, the three-judge panel found that Halabi had been recruited by Hamas's military wing in 2004 and "sent to World Vision in order to gain influence at an international organization", that he "met frequently with Qassam operatives" during his employment, and that he diverted large quantities of iron, plastic piping and digging tools to Hamas for tunnel construction. The court found that in 2012 he twice visited Hamas tunnels and gave $20,000 to a Hamas operative for tunnel repairs. Justice Natan Zlotchover wrote that Halabi's confession was "detailed, coherent, with signs of truthfulness" and was corroborated by classified evidence.

The judges did not accept World Vision's position that its financial controls ruled out diversion, writing that "there is no need to make accurate calculations and it is not even possible to do so; evidence for the transfer of significant sums suffices", and suggesting the charity had limited its financial oversight so as not to harm its working relations with groups in Gaza. Halabi was acquitted of one count of assisting the enemy, on the grounds that as a resident of Gaza he was not a citizen of any state.

On 30 August 2022, Halabi was sentenced to 12 years' imprisonment. He appealed his conviction and sentence to the Supreme Court of Israel; hearings were repeatedly postponed over the defence's access to the classified files.

== Release ==
On 1 February 2025, Halabi was released to Gaza as one of 183 Palestinian prisoners and detainees freed in exchange for three Israeli hostages under the first phase of the 2025 Gaza war ceasefire. On release he again denied the charges and said he had been detained "just because we were giving the aid and the relief to the Gaza people". In March 2026, the Supreme Court formally suspended his appeal after the State Attorney's Office opposed bringing him back into Israel for hearings. In May 2026 he told The Jerusalem Post that he was living in a tent in northern Gaza and trying to return to humanitarian work; he continued to deny any link to Hamas and said that Hamas itself had investigated him over the alleged $50 million.

== Hamas internal documents ==
In February 2026, NGO Monitor published an analysis of three declassified documents from Hamas's Ministry of Interior and National Security dating from March and April 2020. A report by the ministry's counter-espionage branch, dated 11 March 2020 and titled "The detainee in Zionist prisons Mohammed Khalil Mohammed el-Halabi", recorded that Halabi had been in contact with "brothers" in the Qassam Brigades and described his arrest and trial as a major breach of Hamas's internal security. The document stated that Hamas's "monitoring and coordination with all relevant parties in the case had a role in thwarting multiple schemes to bring about the conviction of Mohammed Halabi".

The documents showed that Hamas had a source present at a closed-door hearing in November 2019, interrogated World Vision's head of security in Gaza after learning he might testify, tracked down and questioned suspected informants, and—in a protocol of its committee on non-governmental organisations from April 2020—ordered that World Vision employees be barred from leaving Gaza through the Beit Hanoun (Erez) crossing to prevent them from giving evidence in Israel. NGO Monitor's president, Gerald Steinberg, said the documents showed that World Vision Australia's attacks on the Israeli justice system had been "part of a fabricated smear campaign". World Vision did not respond to requests for comment; Costello, who after the 2022 verdict had written that it "announces the demise of the rule of law in Israeli courts", declined to comment to The Sydney Morning Herald.

== Reactions ==
World Vision said after the 2022 verdict that it would appeal and stood by its audit's finding of no diversion of funds. Costello and other supporters described Halabi as innocent throughout, and after his release Costello called him "a man of great integrity". World Vision Australia later resumed receiving Australian government funding; in 2022–23 the Department of Foreign Affairs and Trade provided it with A$39.9 million.

United Nations human-rights experts, including Special Rapporteur Michael Lynk, said in November 2020 that the proceedings bore "no relation to the trial standards we expect from democracies", and in September 2023 called for the conviction to be overturned, citing the use of secret evidence and closed hearings. The European Union said after the verdict that, according to the OHCHR, it was "inconsistent with international fair trial standards". Amnesty International declared Halabi a prisoner of conscience in May 2023 and described his release as the end of a "miscarriage of justice".

In the United States, Senator Chuck Grassley wrote to World Vision in August 2023 requesting an unredacted copy of its 2017 audit and an account of steps taken to prevent US-funded aid reaching terrorist organisations, noting that World Vision had received $491 million from the US government in 2022. World Vision replied that it "does not support any form of terrorism" but, as of 2026, had not provided the audit.
