= Akhtar Naraghi =

Canadian poet, writer and scholar

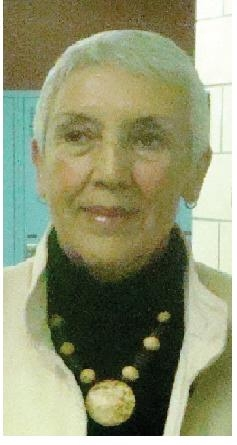
Akhtar Naraghi

Akhtar Naraghi (Persian: اختر نراقی) is a Canadian poet, writer and scholar. She founded the International Organization of the Helen Prize for Women.

== Biography ==
She holds a doctorate in English literature from McGill University and works in English. Her novels are all written in the first person, and revolve around the narrator's efforts to make a home in new surroundings, in different cultures. She has published four novels, in the first three of which – The Big Green House (1994; short-listed for the QSPELL Hugh McLennan Prize for Fiction in 1995), Blue Curtains (1999) and With Mara That Summer (2004) – the narrator-protagonist recounts episodes from her life, beginning in early childhood and ending with her declining years. Her latest novel, On the Train to My Village (2011), is a story of love and the artist's existence partly inspired by the author's time spent in the Gaspé region of Quebec. Her work has been translated into French, Persian and German.

Naraghi is also the author of three collections of verse, Legacy (1992), Solitude (1996) and Autumn Bird (2011), in addition to having contributed forewords, articles and short stories to numerous journals.

In 1987, she founded the International Organization of the Helen Prize for Women, named for Dr. Helen Caldicott, the creator of Physicians for Social Responsibility. The Helen Prize annually honors the achievements of women of the world, whatever their backgrounds or fields of endeavor.
