= Maurice Blackburn (law firm) =

Australian law firm founded in 1919

- Headquarters: Melbourne, Australia
- No. of offices: 30
- No. of employees: 1,000+
- Key people: Tim Trumper (Chair); Jacob Varghese (CEO)
- Revenue: ▼AUD$254.1 million (2024)
- Date founded: 1919
- Founder: Maurice Blackburn
- Company type: Limited liability partnership
- Website: mauriceblackburn.com.au

Maurice Blackburn Lawyers, formerly Maurice Blackburn & Co and Maurice Blackburn Cashman, is an Australian plaintiff law firm. It was founded in 1919 by Maurice Blackburnand has represented clients in a number of high-profile cases since its establishment.

== Major cases ==
Since its establishment Maurice Blackburn Lawyers have acted in a number of cases, including:

- The 40-Hour Working Week Case – in conjunction with the Australian Council of Trade Unions (ACTU) Maurice Blackburn fought for shorter working hours;
- MUA Waterfront Dispute Case – represented maritime workers against the Commonwealth Government during the waterfront dispute in 1998;
- The GIO Class Action – the first shareholder class action win in Australian legal history;
- Centro Class Action – the biggest shareholder class action settlement in Australian legal history;
- Black Saturday bushfires Class Actions – collectively the largest class action settlement in Australian history at $794 million ($494 million in the Kinglake class action and $300 million in the Marysville class action);
- Mohammed Haneef Case – defended Dr. Haneef against false charges of terrorism in 2010 and later acted on his behalf in a defamation matter;
- The Gene Patent BRCA1 Case – a ruling that saw the High Court rule that a mutated gene that causes cancer cannot be subject to a patent under Australian law.

== Current notable staff ==
- Josh Bornstein

== Former notable staff ==
- Maurice Blackburn, founder, former Labor and Independent Labor MP
- James Burke, former Northern Territory politician
- Terri Butler, former federal Labor MP
- John Button, former Labor Senator for Victoria
- John Cain, former Victorian Government Solicitor
- Enver Erdogan, Victorian politician
- Nita Green, Senator for Queensland
- Justice Bernard Murphy, Justice of the Federal Court of Australia
- Nicholas Reece, Lord Mayor of Melbourne
- Nicola Roxon, former Commonwealth Attorney-General and former federal Labor MP
- Bill Shorten, former federal Labor MP and Minister
- Bill Slater, politician and founder of the law firm Slater and Gordon Lawyers
- Murray Watt, Labor Senator and former Queensland Labor MP
- Anika Wells, federal Labor MP
