= Julian Burnside =

Australian barrister and King's Counsel since 1989

Julian Burnside AO KC
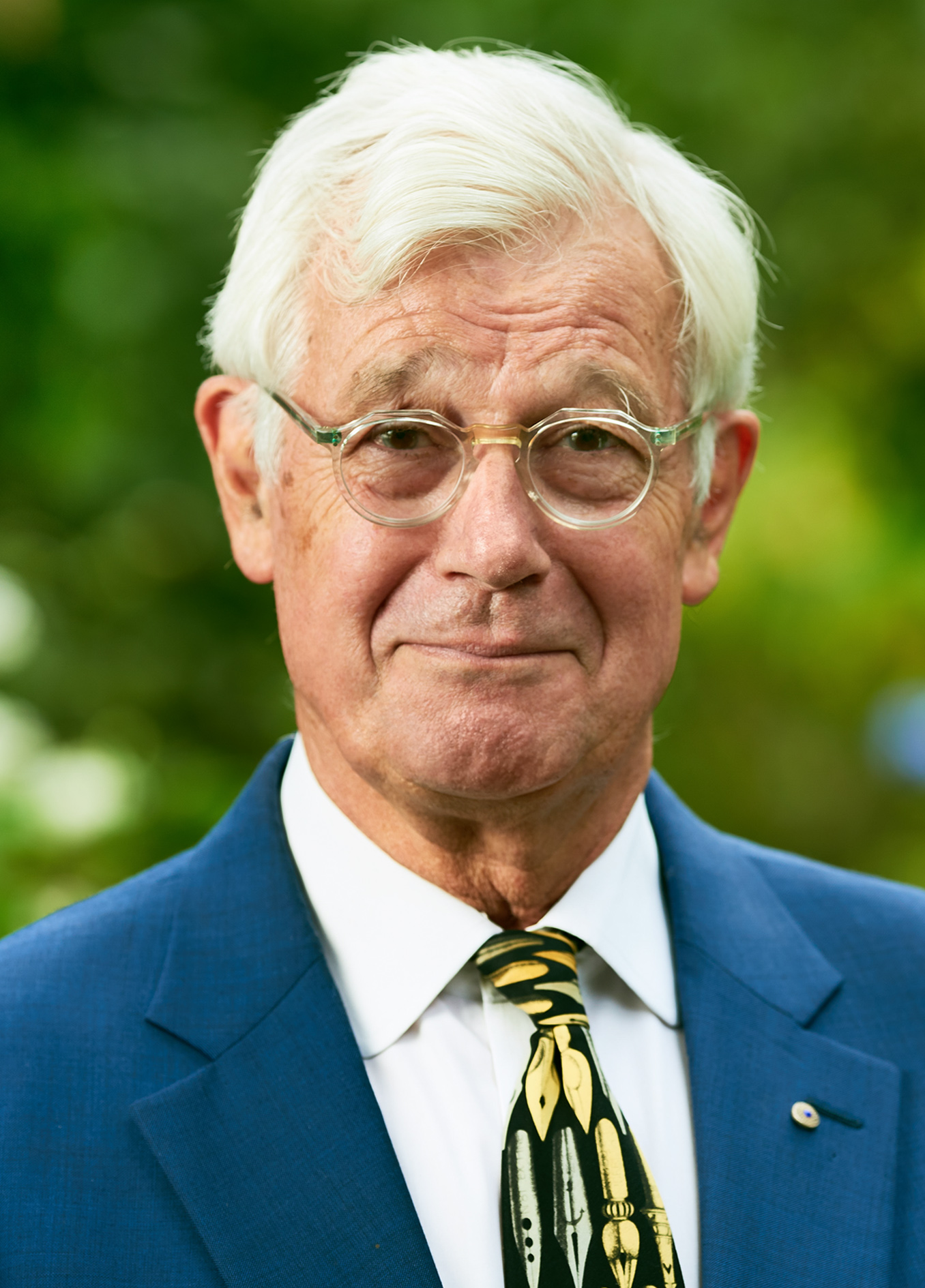
- Burnside in 2019
- Born: Julian William Kennedy Burnside; 9 June 1949 (age 77); Melbourne, Victoria, Australia
- Education: Monash University
- Occupation: Lawyer
- Known for: Commercial law 1998 Australian waterfront dispute Refugee rights
- Political party: Greens (since 2019)
- Relatives: Edith Burnside (grandmother)

Julian William Kennedy Burnside AO KC (born 9 June 1949) is an Australian barrister, human rights and refugee advocate, and author. He practises principally in commercial litigation, trade practices and administrative law. He is best known for his staunch opposition to the mandatory detention of asylum seekers, and has provided legal counsel in a wide variety of high-profile cases. He was made an Officer of the Order of Australia in 2009, "for service as a human rights advocate, particularly for refugees and asylum seekers, to the arts as a patron and fundraiser, and to the law." He unsuccessfully stood for the Division of Kooyong at the 2019 federal election as an Australian Greens candidate, but achieved the highest vote for the Greens in the seat at a federal election and allowed the party to enter into the two-party preferred vote.

== Early life ==
Burnside was born in Melbourne, Victoria to Kennedy Byron Burnside and Olwen Lloyd Banks. His father was a prominent surgeon and his grandmother Dame Edith Burnside was a prominent charity worker. Burnside attended Melbourne Grammar School, graduating with a range of scholarships and prizes. He then studied law and economics at Monash University, with aspirations to eventually work as a management consultant. While at university, Burnside showed immense talent for the study of law and successfully competed in Moot Court competitions (mock court). He was selected to represent Monash at an international competition in New Zealand, in which he was named best speaker and won the Blackstone Cup. After a conversation with Sir Richard Wild, the Chief Justice of New Zealand who had adjudicated, Burnside was persuaded that he should pursue a career as a barrister. He obtained a Bachelor of Economics in 1972 and a Bachelor of Laws in 1973.

Burnside and his wife, Kate, have a daughter, Katherine and a foster son, Mosa.

== Professional career ==
Burnside was admitted as a barrister of the Supreme Court of Victoria in 1976, and appointed a King's Counsel in 1989. His work has always focused primarily on commercial law.

He has appeared in many significant commercial cases, in particular take-over cases and trade practices.

He represented some of Australia's wealthiest people, including Alan Bond and Rose Porteous. Due to these high-profile cases, he became well known in the legal and broader community as a commercial lawyer. As Burnside describes it, until the late 1990s he primarily "acted for the big end of town".

In 1998, Burnside surprised some people by acting for the Maritime Union of Australia in its battle with Patrick Corporation during the 1998 Australian waterfront dispute, one of Australia's most severe and longest industrial relations controversies. The matter went to the High Court of Australia, which eventually found in favour of the Union, albeit with certain conditions. Burnside describes this case as one of his most memorable, and has stated that it convinced him that the survival of reasonable and responsible union representation is crucial if there is to be justice in the workplace. His involvement in the dispute is portrayed by Rhys Muldoon in the 2007 ABC miniseries Bastard Boys.

From the late 1990s onwards, Burnside began to undertake more and more pro bono legal work on a range of human rights-related issues. He acted for Victoria's chief civil liberties organisation in an action against the Australian Government over the Tampa affair and vehemently criticised John Howard's Government for its mandatory detention of asylum seekers arriving in Australia. With his wife, artist Kate Durham, Burnside set up Spare Rooms for Refugees and Spare Lawyers for Refugees, programs which provide free accommodation and legal representation for refugees in Australia.

Throughout this time Burnside has maintained his practice as a commercial litigator, appearing in many major class actions, trade practices cases and general commercial cases.

Burnside has also acted in several major cases on behalf of Indigenous Australians. Most notably, he acted for Bruce Trevorrow, a member of the Indigenous stolen generation, in which Trevorrow sued the South Australian Government for having removed him from his parents. For the first time in Australian legal history, an Australian government was found liable for such conduct, and the court awarded $500,000 in damages to Mr Trevorrow.

In 2004 Burnside was awarded the Human Rights Law Award by the Human Rights and Equal Opportunity Commission and sponsored by the Law Council of Australia for his pro-bono legal work for asylum seekers and for his work in establishing Spare Lawyers for Refugees. Also in 2004, he was elected an Australian Living Treasure. In 2006 he was inducted as an honorary member of the Monash University Golden Key Society. In 2007 he received the Australian Peace Prize from the Peace Organisation of Australia and in 2014 the Sydney Peace Prize from the Sydney Peace Foundation.

Burnside has also written several successful publications on law, human rights and philology. In addition to his work in the law, he is a patron of numerous arts organisations. He regularly commissions classical music compositions and sculptures, and is Chair of two arts organisations, Fortyfive Downstairs and the Mietta Foundation. His commission to Australian composer Lyle Chan for a tongue-in-cheek work entitled Wind Farm Music Dedicated To Tony Abbott attracted substantial publicity for its stance protesting the anti-renewable energy policy of the Prime Minister of the day, Tony Abbott.

=== Notable cases ===
- Defending Alan Bond
- Interrogating John Laws and Alan Jones as counsel assisting the Australian Broadcasting Authority's 'cash-for-comment' inquiry
- Assisting the Maritime Union of Australia defeat Patrick Stevedores in the High Court (see also 1998 Australian waterfront dispute). His role in this case was dramatized in the ABC miniseries Bastard Boys
- Counsel for the Ok Tedi community against BHP
- Counsel for Stephen Mayne and Crikey Media against Steve Price and 3AW
- Counsel for Rose Porteous in numerous actions against Gina Rinehart
- Counsel for Liberty Victoria in the Tampa litigation
- Counsel for Plaintiffs in class action against Esso for the fire at Longford, Victoria
- Counsel for Bruce Trevorrow successfully claiming compensation for damage as a member of the Stolen Generation against the state of South Australia
- Counsel for Mary Kostakidis in litigation against SBS
- Counsel for NCSC in BHP takeover cases
- Counsel for ACI in takeover case
- Counsel for Respondent in Autodesk v Dyason
- Counsel for Plaintiff in Crittenden v ANZ
- Counsel assisting Australian Broadcasting Authority in Cash for Comment enquiry
- Counsel for Applicant in ACCC v J McPhee & Co
- Counsel for Applicant in ACCC v Universal Music & ors
- Counsel for Respondent in ACCC v MUA & ors
- Counsel for Respondent in ACCC v SIP & ors
- Counsel for Applicant in Ruhani v. Commissioner of Police No 1 and No 2 (High Court litigation relating to the Pacific Solution)
- Counsel for Intervenor in Melway v Hicks
- Counsel for Applicant in ACCC v Leahy Petroleum
- Counsel for Plaintiff in Mirvac v La Rocca
- Counsel for Respondent individual in ACCC v Visy, Carroll & ors
- Counsel for Plaintiff in Premier Developments v Spotless
- Counsel for Respondent James Hird (Essendon FC Head Coach) in negotiations with the AFL over the 2012 performance-enhancing drug scandal.

== Political career ==
Burnside has been an ambassador for the National Secular Lobby since 2017.

In March 2019, Burnside announced he had joined the Australian Greens party and would run against Josh Frydenberg for the seat of Kooyong at the forthcoming federal election. Frydenberg received a swing of 8.2% against him as well as the lowest Liberal vote in Kooyong in 76 years. Burnside was also the closest candidate to winning the seat in 90 years, with a two-party preferred vote at 44.3%.

In May 2020, Burnside announced he was running for a Greens Senate seat, in a pre-selection held to replace the retiring senator Richard Di Natale. Burnside lost the contest to Lidia Thorpe, who would become the first female Aboriginal Senator for Victoria.

== Controversy ==
In July 2016, Burnside published a blogpost in which he appeared to support statements made by Shady Alsuleiman, an Australian Muslim cleric. Referring to HIV/AIDS, Alsuleiman had said that, "homosexuality [...] is spreading all these diseases" and that, "if you speak to a doctor, the most terrifying diseases come from [...] sexual activities". Burnside wrote that Alsuleiman's remarks "appear to have medical support" and "were probably accurate as a matter of medical observation". He subsequently received criticism from opinion columnists in The Spectator Australia and the Herald Sun, with Rita Panahi (writing for the latter) accusing him of perpetuating the stereotype that homosexual people are responsible for the spread of HIV/AIDS. In a follow-up post, where he referred to critics as either having "an intellectual disability" or "a reading disorder", Burnside said, "I do NOT disapprove of gay people: I think every human being should be able to live their own life, guided by their nature and instincts". Burnside claimed that his comments had been taken out of context, and that he was simply, "responding to a person who had said the Grand Mufti had called for gays to be killed", which was "plainly wrong". Burnside also stated that, "By reporting the truth of the matter, I was not in the least approving hate speech... I do not disapprove of homosexuality."

On 8 March 2019, in a debate on Sky News with Victorian Liberal Senator Jane Hume, Burnside announced that he had been a member of a Melbourne-based men's-only club, The Savage Club for 40 years. During the same interview, he also pointed his finger at Hume when she interjected, telling her "not to interrupt" which was seen as a sexist manoeuvre on part of Burnside. On 9 March, Burnside tweeted that he had resigned as a member of the Savage Club, citing that men's only clubs are a relic of the past, that he had joined as a very different person and that he had attempted to change its culture from within.

In April 2019, it was reported that Burnside has defended female genital mutilation; however, he has since stated that his comments were made as part of a "hypothetical legal argument", and that he believes both then and now that it should be banned. The allegation ostensibly referred to a paper Burnside had given to the Medico-Legal Society in 1994. The paper includes the sentence: "I do not for a minute support or approve of mutilation of any sort or genital mutilation in particular" (The Proceedings of the Medico-Legal Society of Victoria 1994–2002, at page 14)

== Bibliography ==
=== Books ===
- Burnside, Julian (1991). Matilda and the Dragon. Illustrated by Bettina Guthridge. Sydney: Allen & Unwin. ISBN 1-86373-127-X. Children's book.
- From Nothing to Zero: letters from refugees in Australia's detention centres ((ed.) Melbourne: Lonely Planet, 2003, ISBN 1-74059-668-4)
- Wordwatching: Fieldnotes of an Amateur Philologist (Melbourne: Scribe, 2004, ISBN 1-56025-840-3)
- Watching brief: reflections on human rights, law, and justice (Melbourne: Scribe, 2007, ISBN 978-1-921215-49-0)
- On Privilege (Melbourne: Melbourne University Press, 2009, ISBN 978-0-522-85633-0)
- Watching Out: Reflections on Justice & Injustice (Melbourne: Scribe, 2017)

=== Published papers ===
- "Information technology: Internet - legal issues" (Melbourne: Leo Cussen Institute, 1998, ISBN 0-86394-520-1)
- "Spare rooms for refugees" with Kate Durham (electronic resource - archived on ANL archived on ANL)

=== Book reviews ===
Date	Review article	Work(s) reviewed
2011	Burnside, Julian (September 2011). "Born to see". Australian Book Review (334): 44–45.	Ennis, Helen (2011). Wolfgang Sievers. National Library of Australia.
