= Aveo =

Aveo may refer to:

- Aveo Group, an Australian senior living company
- Chevrolet Aveo, a 2002–2020 American subcompact car
- Chevrolet Sail, a 2000–present Chinese-American subcompact car, sold in Central America as Chevrolet Aveo

== See also ==
- Aveos Fleet Performance, a former Canadian aircraft component company
