= Snake River Alliance =

U.S. non-profit organization

Snake River Alliance (SRA)
- Founded: 1979
- Type: 501(c)(3) charitable organization
- Location: Boise, Idaho
- Region served: Idaho
- Website: snakeriveralliance.org

The Snake River Alliance (SRA) is a non-profit organization which focuses on nuclear and clean energy issues in Idaho. They are a watchdog group working to "raise community awareness about the dangers of nuclear waste, weapons and power while working to identify and promote sustainable alternatives." The SRA does this through a number of different methods, including advocacy, collaboration, grassroots organizing, and education.

== History ==
The Snake River Alliance was formed in 1979 shortly after the Three Mile Island Incident and the discovery that the Idaho National Laboratory was dumping hazardous waste into the Snake River Aquifer on a routine basis. The SRA worked to get this practice stopped, and was successful in 1987. Since then, the alliance has continued to work to protect Idaho from nuclear waste, and in 2004 began advocating for clean energy in Idaho."

== Issues ==
=== Nuclear waste ===
One of the Snake River Alliance’s main goals has been to protect Idaho and stop more nuclear waste from coming into the state. The SRA does not want to see Idaho become a dumping ground for nuclear waste, and believes that the risks of nuclear contamination outweigh the benefits. In 2018, the group opposed the proposed shipment of plutonium-based wastes into Idaho by the U.S. Department of Energy. The group also monitors the Leadership in Nuclear Energy (LINE) Commission Home established by former Governor Clement Leroy "Butch" Otter to consider the role of nuclear technologies in Idaho's future. The SRA monitors activities at the Idaho National Laboratory to assure existing nuclear waste contamination continues to be cleaned up and is no longer a threat to the Snake River Aquifer.

The SRA has also worked to stop nuclear power plants from coming to Idaho. The Snake River Alliance worked to stop the French company Areva from building a nuclear plant in Eastern Idaho. Areva currently has license from the Nuclear Regulatory Commission (NRC) but as of February 2013, nothing further has occurred because of economic turmoil within the company. In recent years, the SRA challenged the legitimacy of the proposed Alternate Energy Holdings Inc (AEHI) Nuclear Power plant proposal which was eventually shown to be a scam. In December 2010, once the Securities and Exchange Commission (SEC) sued AEHI for fraud, the SRA turned its attention towards other threats.

The SRA is currently an active member of the Alliance for Nuclear Accountability (ANA).

=== Clean energy ===
The SRA added Clean Energy into their mission in 2004, and work with electric utilities, the Public Utilities Commission, and city and state governments to achieve their mission. In 2016, the organization launched the Solarize the Valley program. facilitating the growth of rooftop solar in Idaho.

The group also advocates against the use of coal because of negative environmental impacts and high costs . In 2005, the Alliance helped stop a coal plant that was proposed for Jerome, Idaho.

The SRA also advocates for clean energy policies at the state level, and helped with a draft of the Idaho Energy Plan on 2007 and helped to create the Idaho Energy Collaborative Shaping Idaho's Clean Energy Future in 2008.
