= Tim Costello =

Australian Baptist minister (born 1955)

The Reverend Tim Costello AO
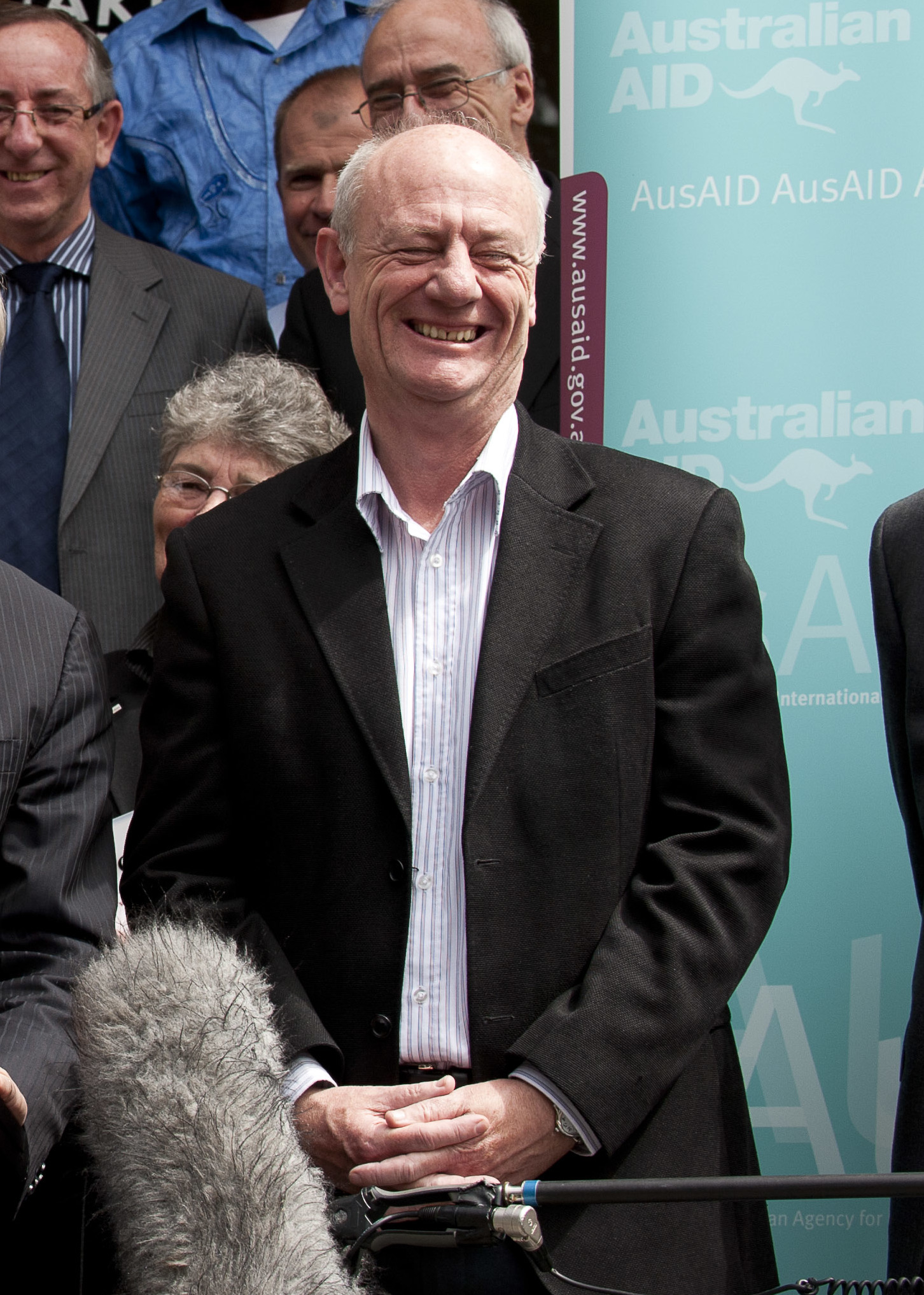
- Costello in 2012

Personal life
- Born: Timothy Ewen Costello; 4 March 1955 (age 71) Melbourne, Victoria, Australia
- Spouse: Merridie Costello
- Education: Carey Baptist Grammar School; Monash University; International Baptist Seminary Rueschlikon; Melbourne College of Divinity
- Relatives: Peter Costello (brother); Patrick Costello

Religious life
- Religion: Christianity (Baptist)
- Church: St Kilda Baptist Church; Collins Street Baptist Church

Senior posting
- Post: Mayor of St Kilda; President of the Baptist Union of Australia (1999–2002); CEO of World Vision Australia (2003–2016)

Timothy Ewen Costello AO (born 4 March 1955) is an Australian Baptist minister who was the Chief Executive Officer and Chief Advocate of World Vision Australia. Costello worked as a lawyer and served as mayor of St Kilda. He has authored a number of books on faith and life. A National Trust poll in 2014 elected him one of Australia's 100 national living treasures.

== Early life ==
Costello was born in Melbourne, Victoria, where he grew up in the suburb of Blackburn and was educated at Carey Baptist Grammar School (graduating in 1972). He is a descendant of Irish immigrant Patrick Costello, who was expelled from the Parliament of Victoria in the 1860s for electoral fraud.

Costello studied at Monash University, graduating with a Bachelor of Jurisprudence degree in 1976, a Bachelor of Laws in 1978 and a Diploma of Education in 1979.

Costello is the brother of Peter Costello, the former treasurer of Australia and Federal Member for Higgins.

== Career ==
=== Legal ===
Costello practised as a solicitor in family and criminal law, both in established firms and in his own practice.

=== Ministry ===
In 1981, Costello travelled to Switzerland with his wife, Merridie, where they both studied theology at the International Baptist Seminary Rüschlikon near Zürich, before graduating with a Bachelor of Divinity and returning to Australia to become the minister of St Kilda Baptist Church. He also received a Master of Theology from Whitley College, a theological college of the Melbourne College of Divinity.

Ordained as a Baptist minister in 1987, Costello, along with his wife Merridie and a team of others, rebuilt the congregation at the St Kilda Baptist Church and opened a drop-in centre. As part of the church's outreach program, he started a legal office at the church where he practised as a part-time solicitor. He also taught urban ministry at Whitley College, a college of the University of Melbourne.

From 1995 to 2003, Costello was a minister of the Collins Street Baptist Church and the executive director of Urban Seed, a Christian not-for-profit organisation created in response to concern about homelessness, drug abuse and the marginalisation of the city's street people.

Costello served as the president of the Baptist Union of Australia from 1999 to 2002. He has also been patron of Baptist World Aid Australia, a member of the Australian Earth Charter Committee, a council member of the Australian Centre for Christianity and Culture, a spokesperson for the Interchurch Gambling Taskforce, a member of the National Advisory Body on Gambling and a member of the Alcohol Education and Rehabilitation Foundation.

=== Political career ===
Costello was elected Mayor of St Kilda Council in 1993 and became well known for championing the cause of local democracy and for his clashes with the Premier of Victoria, Jeff Kennett. Kennett attacked Costello as being un-Victorian for speaking out against the gaming-led recovery of the state and often referred to him as "that leftist cleric". Costello's political career ended when his mayoral position was abolished with the whole St Kilda Council in Kennett's reform and consolidation of local government in 1994. Towards the end of that time, he was approached by the Australian Democrats political party to fill a casual vacancy in the Senate, but decided against it, partly due to the likelihood that this could place him in direct conflict with his brother if Peter became Treasurer.

Costello was an elected delegate at the Australian Constitutional Convention in Canberra in February 1998. Throughout the late 1990s and early 2000s, he was frequently seen in the Australian national media commenting on gambling and other social problems. He also has spoken out in favour of stronger gun control in Australia, acting at times as the co-chairman or spokesman of the National Coalition for Gun Control.

=== World Vision Australia ===
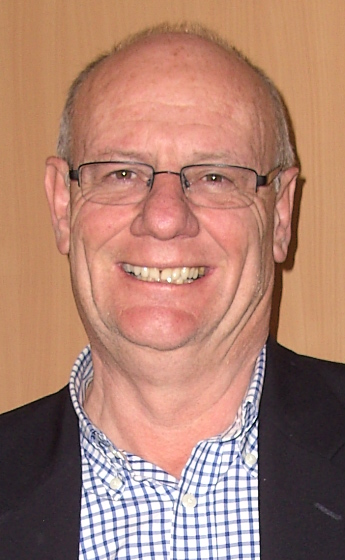
Costello in June 2010

Costello was appointed as CEO of World Vision Australia on 24 November 2003. Having spent much of his career focussing on local and domestic issues, Costello said he relished the opportunity to focus on international issues. In his first full year in the role, Costello became the face of Australia's response to the Boxing Day Tsunami. Costello led fundraising efforts, and World Vision Australia raised over $118 million for relief and rehabilitation programs. During Costello's tenure, the organisation grew from funding 480 projects benefiting 10.4 million people, to more than 800 World Vision development projects benefiting close to 100 million people across the globe including in Australia.

After 13 years as CEO, Costello announced that he was stepping aside to become the Chief Advocate for World Vision Australia on 9 May 2016. He remained as Chief Advocate for a further two years before resigning on 7 June 2019, citing the physical and emotional toll of the role over many years.

=== Other roles ===
Costello has since become the Director of Ethical Voice, Executive Director of Micah Australia and a Senior Fellow at Centre for Public Christianity. He is also Chair of the Community Council of Australia and an Advocate for the Alliance for Gambling Reform.

== Awards and honours ==
Costello received the Victorian of the Year award in July 2004 in recognition of his public and community service. He was made an officer of the Order of Australia in June 2005 and was the Victorian nominee for the Australian of the Year award in 2006. He is the 2008 winner of the Australian Peace Prize awarded by the Peace Organisation of Australia. He is also listed by the National Trust as a "National Living Treasure".

In 2008, Costello received an honorary doctorate from the Australian Catholic University in recognition of "his contributions to religious life and social justice".

In 2025, Costello was awarded an Honorary Doctorate at Monash University following his devotion to social justice, global poverty and community wellbeing.

== Publications ==
- Costello, Tim; Riddell, Michael; Gill, Athol; Nichols, Alan; U'ren, John; Duncan, Michael; Corney, Peter; Ministry in an Urban World: Responding to the City, Acorn Press, ACT, 1991, ISBN 0-908284-10-1
- Costello, Tim, Streets of Hope: Finding God in St Kilda Allen & Unwin, 1997, ISBN 978-1-86448-890-6
- Costello, Tim, Tips from a Travelling Soul Searcher Allen & Unwin, 1999, ISBN 978-1-86508-225-7
- Costello, Tim and Millar, Royce, Wanna Bet? Winners and Losers in Gambling's Luck Myth, Allen & Unwin, Sydney, 2000. ISBN 1-86508-371-2
- Costello, Tim and Yule, Rod, Another Way to Love, Acorn Press, 2009, ISBN 978-0-908284-82-5
- Costello, Tim, Hope, Hardie Grant Books, 2012, ISBN 978-174270375-6
- Costello, Tim, Faith: Embracing Life in all its Uncertainty, Hardie Grant Books, 2017, ISBN 978-1743791929
- Costello, Tim, A Lot with a Little, Hardie Grant Books, 2019, ISBN 978-174379552-1
