= Watching Brief: Reflections on Human Rights, Law, and Justice =

2007 book by Julian Burnside

- Author: Julian Burnside
- Cover artist: Sandy Cull, gogoGinko
- Language: English
- Published: 2007
- Publication place: Australia
- ISBN: 978-1-921215-49-0

Watching Brief: Reflections on Human Rights, Law, and Justice is a book of essays written by Australian lawyer and human rights advocate Julian Burnside published in 2007. It deals with issues relating to Australian politics, refugees, and Burnside's legal experiences.

Burnside credits three people with inspiring the book; firstly his wife Kate Durham who supported him in his work representing refugees. Secondly, fellow lawyer John Manetta who asked him to participate in the Tampa case. Thirdly, an 11-year old Iranian girl who was locked up in Woomera Detention Centre for 15 months and repeatedly attempted suicide after being moved to Maribyrnong Detention Centre and not being properly cared for.
