= Michael J. Martin =

- Born: 1950s
- Education: Loyola University of Chicago (BS); University of Chicago (MD); Yale University (Residency); UC Berkeley (MPH, MBA); UCSF (Fellowship)
- Occupations: Physician, epidemiologist, public health advocate
- Employer(s): University of California, San Francisco
- Known for: Cardiovascular disease research, tobacco control advocacy, antibiotic resistance advocacy
- Title: Associate Clinical Professor of Epidemiology and Biostatistics

Michael Joseph Martin is an American physician, epidemiologist, and public health advocate. He is an Associate Clinical Professor in the Department of Epidemiology and Biostatistics at the University of California, San Francisco (UCSF), where he has taught since 1987 and maintained a clinical practice for over 30 years.

Martin's research has focused on cardiovascular disease epidemiology, tobacco control, and antibiotic resistance. In 1986, he was lead author on a large-scale epidemiological study published in The Lancet examining cholesterol levels and mortality in over 361,000 men. His research on passive smoking in the 1980s contributed to evidence on the health effects of secondhand smoke, and he received the U.S. Department of Health and Human Services Secretary's Award for Innovation in Health in 1985 for his tobacco control work.

Martin founded Physicians Against Red Meat (PhARM), a physician-led advocacy organization, and served as President of Physicians for Social Responsibility from 2022 to 2023. He has been a regular contributor of opinion pieces to the San Francisco Chronicle on public health topics spanning three decades.

== Early life and education ==
Martin earned his Bachelor of Science degree in Biology (summa cum laude) from Loyola University of Chicago in 1977, where he served as president of the Blue Key National Honor Society. He received his Doctor of Medicine (with honors) from the University of Chicago Pritzker School of Medicine in 1981, earning both the Frank McLean Research Award and the Upjohn Achievement Award.

He completed his internal medicine residency at Yale University in 1984, followed by a preventive medicine residency at the University of California, Berkeley, and a clinical epidemiology fellowship at the University of California, San Francisco. Martin holds a Master of Public Health (MPH) and Master of Business Administration (MBA) from the University of California, Berkeley, both earned in 1987. He is a member of the Beta Gamma Sigma international honor society.

== Career ==
=== Academic and clinical work ===
Martin has been an Associate Clinical Professor in the Department of Epidemiology and Biostatistics at UCSF since 1987. For more than 30 years, he maintained a clinical practice at the General Medicine Clinic at Zuckerberg San Francisco General Hospital, a UCSF affiliate, while teaching medical students at the UCSF School of Medicine.

=== Research ===
==== Cardiovascular disease ====
In 1986, Martin was lead author on a study published in The Lancet titled "Serum cholesterol, blood pressure, and mortality: implications from a cohort of 361,662 men." The epidemiological study examined the relationship between cholesterol levels, blood pressure, and mortality in over 361,000 men screened for the Multiple Risk Factor Intervention Trial.

==== Tobacco control ====
During the mid-1980s, Martin conducted research on passive smoking and its cardiovascular effects. His work examined heart disease rates among men married to smokers compared to men married to nonsmokers, contributing to the body of evidence on secondhand smoke's health impacts.

In 1985, Martin studied San Francisco's workplace smoking ordinance, which had taken effect in 1984. His research, presented at the American Public Health Association meeting, was featured in The Washington Post. For this work, Martin received the U.S. Department of Health and Human Services Secretary's Award for Innovation in Health in 1985.

==== Antibiotic resistance ====
In 2015, Martin was lead author of "Antibiotics Overuse in Animal Agriculture: A Call to Action for Health Care Providers," published in the American Journal of Public Health. The paper called on healthcare providers and institutions to oppose routine antibiotic use in livestock and to purchase antibiotic-free meat. His advocacy work on this issue received coverage in the San Francisco Chronicle.

== Advocacy and public engagement ==
=== Physicians Against Red Meat ===
Martin founded Physicians Against Red Meat (PhARM), a physician-led organization that advocates for reduced red meat consumption for health and environmental reasons. As founder and president, Martin has focused the organization on highlighting connections between red meat consumption and health issues including cardiovascular disease, cancer, and antibiotic resistance, as well as environmental impacts such as climate change.

Martin has written extensively about red meat's health and environmental impacts in major newspapers. His opinion pieces in the San Francisco Chronicle have addressed research on red meat and mortality, the relationship between livestock production and climate change, and critiques of studies minimizing red meat's health risks.

=== Physicians for Social Responsibility ===
Martin served as President of Physicians for Social Responsibility (PSR) from January 2022 to January 2023, and is the organization's Immediate Past President. PSR is a Washington, D.C.-based nonprofit organization focused on preventing nuclear war and addressing climate change. As the U.S. affiliate of International Physicians for the Prevention of Nuclear War (IPPNW), PSR shared in the 1985 Nobel Peace Prize awarded to IPPNW. IPPNW later founded the International Campaign to Abolish Nuclear Weapons (ICAN), which won the Nobel Peace Prize in 2017.

Martin also serves on PSR's national board of directors. In 2025, PSR continues to be active in nuclear disarmament advocacy, with museum exhibits at Harvard University recognizing the organization's historic work and ongoing relevance.

In his role with PSR, Martin has written about nuclear weapons risks, including a 2022 opinion piece co-authored with Tova Fuller for the San Francisco Chronicle addressing nuclear safety concerns related to the war in Ukraine.

=== Bread for the World ===
Martin serves as Treasurer of the board of directors at Bread for the World, a national advocacy organization working to end hunger, where he has been a member for more than 30 years.

=== Public commentary ===
Martin has been a regular contributor to public health discourse through opinion pieces in the San Francisco Chronicle spanning from 1994 to the present. His commentary has addressed diverse topics including sun protection and skin health (1994), red meat consumption and health (2020), climate change and health (2021), nuclear weapons policy (2022), and public health responses to COVID-19 (2020).

== Awards and honors ==
- U.S. Department of Health and Human Services Secretary's Award for Innovation in Health (1985)
- Beta Gamma Sigma Business Honor Society (1987)
- Frank McLean Research Award, University of Chicago (1981)
- Upjohn Achievement Award, University of Chicago (1981)
- Blue Key National Honor Society President, Loyola University of Chicago (1976)

== Selected publications ==
- Martin, M.J.; Hulley, S.B.; Browner, W.S.; Kuller, L.H.; Wentworth, D. (1986-10-25). "Serum cholesterol, blood pressure, and mortality: implications from a cohort of 361,662 men". The Lancet. 2 (8513): 933–936. PMID 2877128.
- Martin, M.J.; Thottathil, S.E.; Newman, T.B. (December 2015). "Antibiotics Overuse in Animal Agriculture: A Call to Action for Health Care Providers". American Journal of Public Health. 105 (12): 2409–2410. PMC 4638249. PMID 26469675.
- Martin, M.J.; Silverman, M.F. (1986). "The San Francisco experience with regulation of smoking in the workplace: the first twelve months". American Journal of Public Health. 76 (5): 585–586. PMC 1646604. PMID 3963290.
