= Helen Caldicott =

Australian anti-nuclear advocate

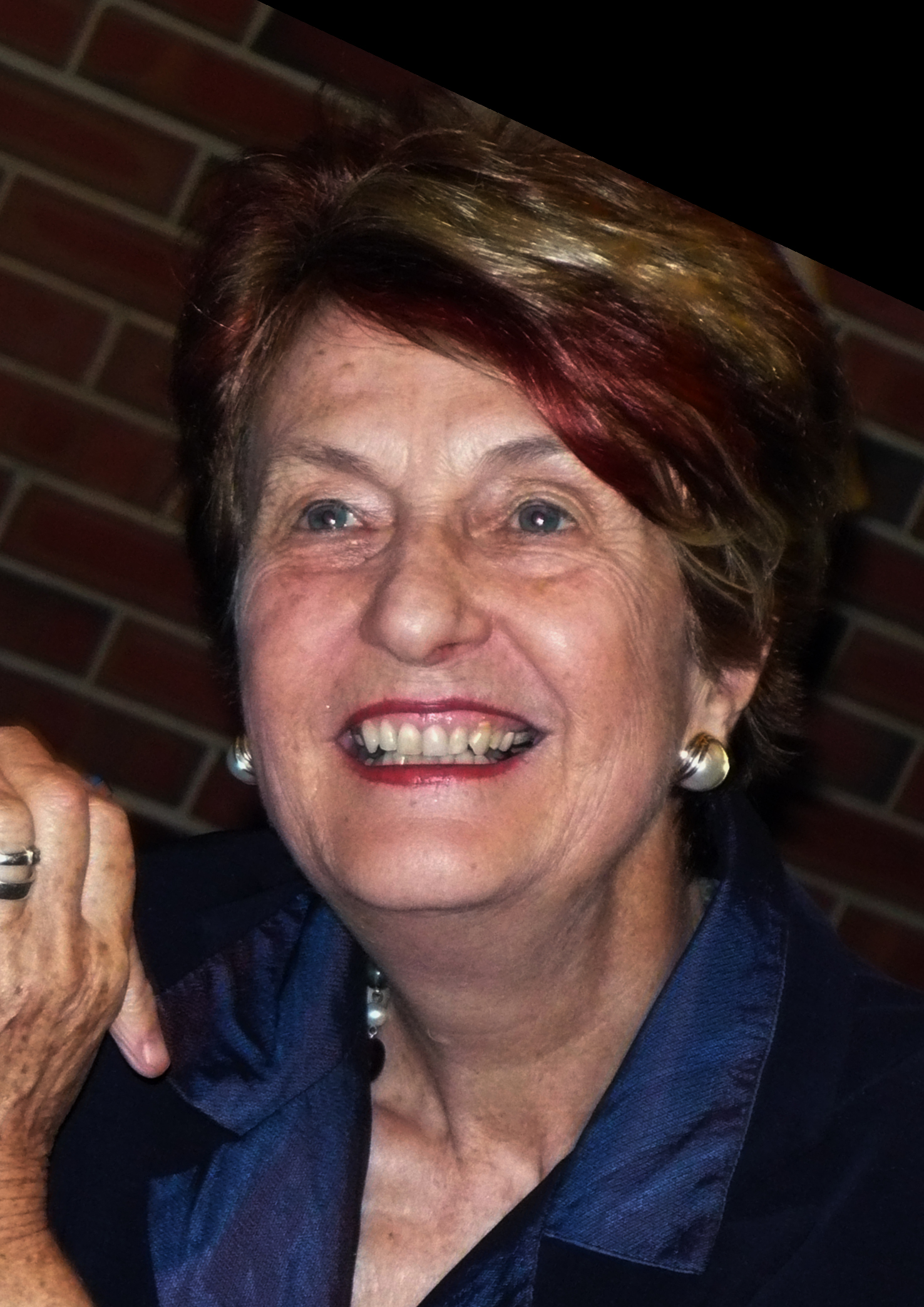
- Caldicott in 2007
- Born: Helen Mary Broinowski; 7 August 1938 (age 88); Melbourne, Victoria, Australia
- Occupations: Physician, activist
- Spouse: William Caldicott
- Children: Philip, Penny, William Jr
- Website: https://www.helencaldicott.com/ – Helen Caldicott's official website

Helen Mary Caldicott (born 7 August 1938) is an Australian physician, author, and anti-nuclear advocate. She founded several associations dedicated to opposing the use of nuclear power, depleted uranium munitions, nuclear weapons, nuclear weapons proliferation, and military action in general.

== Early life and education ==
Helen Caldicott was born on 7 August 1938, in Melbourne, Australia, the daughter of factory manager [Theo] Philip Broinowski and Mary Mona Enyd (Coffey) Broinowski, an interior designer. She attended public school, except for four years at Fintona Girls' School at Balwyn, a private secondary school. When she was 17, she enrolled at the University of Adelaide medical school and graduated in 1961 with a MBBS degree. In 1962, she married William Caldicott, a paediatric radiologist who has since worked with her in her campaigns. They have three children, Philip, Penny, and William Jr.

Caldicott and her husband moved to Boston, Massachusetts in 1966 and she entered a three-year fellowship in nutrition at Harvard Medical School. Returning to Adelaide in 1969, she accepted a position in the renal unit of Queen Elizabeth Hospital. In the early 1970s, she completed a year's residency and a two-year internship in paediatrics at the Adelaide Children's Hospital to qualify as a paediatric physician so she could legitimately establish the first Australian clinic for cystic fibrosis at the Adelaide Children's Hospital. The clinic now has the best survival rates in Australia. In 1977, she joined the staff of the Children's Hospital Medical Center in Boston as an instructor in paediatrics. She taught paediatrics at the Harvard Medical School from 1977 to 1980.

== Anti-nuclear activism ==
=== Early activity ===
Caldicott at the San Francisco Public Library

Caldicott's interest in nuclear issues was sparked when she read the 1957 Nevil Shute book On the Beach, a novel about a nuclear holocaust set in Australia.

In the 1970s, she gained prominence in Australia, New Zealand, and North America, speaking on the health hazards of radiation from the perspective of paediatrics. Her early achievements included convincing Australia to sue France over its atmospheric testing of nuclear weapons in the Pacific in 1971 and 1972, which brought the practice to an end. She also informed Australian trade unions about the medical and military dangers of uranium mining, which led to a three-year ban of the mining and export of uranium.

After visiting the Soviet Union in 1979 with an AFSC delegation and upon learning the impending US deployment of cruise missiles (which would end arms control) and Pershing II missiles that could hit Moscow from Europe in 3 minutes, Caldicott left her medical career to concentrate on calling the world's attention to what she referred to as the "insanity" of the nuclear arms race and the growing reliance on nuclear power. In 1978 she reinvigorated Physicians for Social Responsibility. Over time she and others recruited 23,000 physicians to this organisation which, through wide educational efforts, taught the US public about the dire medical implications of both nuclear power and nuclear war. In 1985, International Physicians for the Prevention of Nuclear War was awarded the 1985 Nobel Peace Prize. She was herself nominated for the Nobel Prize by Linus Pauling, himself a Nobel winner.

In 1980, she founded the Women's Action for Nuclear Disarmament (WAND) in the United States, which was later renamed Women's Action for New Directions. It is a group dedicated to reducing or redirecting government spending away from nuclear energy and nuclear weapons toward what the group perceives as unmet social issues.

In 1989, Caldicott was interviewed by Caroline Jones on her Radio National program, The Search for Meaning.

Caldicott stood as an independent candidate for the Australian House of Representatives at the 1990 federal election, contesting the Division of Richmond, against the Leader of the National Party, Charles Blunt. She polled 23.3% of the votes; not enough to win, but her preferences went mostly to the Labor candidate, Neville Newell, electing him and unseating Blunt.

In 2002 Caldicott released The New Nuclear Danger, a commentary on the George Bush military–industrial complex. The book was reviewed by Ivan Eland of The Independent Institute. He wrote, "She makes many cogent criticisms about current and prior administrations' nuclear policies and the excesses of the government-dominated military–industrial complex associated with nuclear weapons, but her often valid points are undermined by other far-fetched or alarmist arguments, sloppy research, and haphazard footnoting."

In 2008 Caldicott founded the Helen Caldicott Foundation for a Nuclear Free Future which, for over four years, produced a weekly radio commentary, "If You Love This Planet".

In April 2011, Caldicott was involved in a public argument in The Guardian with British journalist George Monbiot. Monbiot expressed great concern at what he saw as a failure by Caldicott to provide adequate justification for any of her arguments. Regarding Caldicott's book Nuclear Power is Not The Answer, he wrote: "The scarcity of references to scientific papers and the abundance of unsourced claims it contains amaze me." Caldicott responded, "As we have seen, he and other nuclear industry apologists sow confusion about radiation risks and, in my view, in much the same way that the tobacco industry did in previous decades about the risks of smoking." Also in 2011, Caldicott made a written submission regarding the Darlington Nuclear Generating Station new build project in Canada in which she wrote that plutonium can cause cancer of the testicles after accumulation in these organs.

In 2014, Physicians for Social Responsibility hosted a lecture on "Fukushima's Ongoing Impact" by Caldicott in Seattle, Washington.

== Honours and awards ==
Caldicott has been awarded 21 honorary doctoral degrees. In 1982, she received the Humanist of the Year award from the American Humanist Association. In 1992, Caldicott received the 1992 Peace Abbey Courage of Conscience Award at the John F. Kennedy Presidential Library in Boston for her leadership in the worldwide disarmament movement. She was inducted to the Victorian Honour Roll of Women in 2001. She was awarded the Lannan Foundation Prize for Cultural Freedom in 2003 and, in 2006, the Peace Organisation of Australia presented her with the inaugural Australian Peace Prize "for her longstanding commitment to raising awareness about the medical and environmental hazards of the nuclear age". The Smithsonian Institution has named Caldicott as one of the most influential women of the 20th century. She is a member of the scientific committee of the Fundacion IDEAS, a progressive think tank in Spain. She serves on the Advisory Council of the Nuclear Age Peace. In 2009, she was designated a Women's History Month Honoree by the National Women's History Project.

== Bibliography ==
Books by Helen Caldicott
| Title | Year of Publication | Publisher(s) | ISBN | Role |
|---|---|---|---|---|
| Nuclear Madness: What You Can Do! | 1978 (revised 1994) | W.W. Norton & Company | ISBN 0393310116 | Author |
| Missile Envy: The Arms Race and Nuclear War | 1984 | William Morrow & Co | ISBN 978-0688019549 | Author |
| If You Love This Planet | 1992 | W. W. Norton & Company | ISBN 978-0393308358 | Author |
| A Desperate Passion: An Autobiography | 1996 | W.W. Norton & Company | ISBN 0393316807 | Author |
| Metal of Dishonor: How Depleted Uranium Penetrates Steel, Radiates People and Contaminates the Environment | 1997 | International Action Center | ISBN 0965691608 | Author |
| The New Nuclear Danger: George W.Bush's Military–Industrial Complex | 2002 (revised 2004) | The New Press Scribe Publications (Australia) | ISBN 1565847407, 0908011652 | Author |
| Nuclear Power is Not the Answer | 2006 | The New Press Melbourne University Press | ISBN 978-1595580672 | Author |
| War in Heaven: The Arms Race in Outer Space | 2007 | The New Press | ISBN 978-1595581143 | Co-author with Craig Eisendrath |
| Carbon-Free and Nuclear-Free: A Roadmap for U.S. Energy Policy | 2007 | RDR Books | ISBN 978-1571431738 | Author of Afterword (author is Arjun Makhijani) |
| If You Love This Planet: A Plan to Save the Earth | 2009 | W.W. Norton & Company | ISBN 978-0393333022 | Author |
| Loving This Planet | 2012 | The New Press | ISBN 978-1595580672 | Editor |
| Crisis Without End: The Medical and Ecological Consequences of the Fukushima Nuclear Catastrophe | 2014 | The New Press | ISBN 978-1595589606 | Editor |
| Sleepwalking to Armageddon | 2017 | The New Press | ISBN 978-1620972465 | Editor |

== Documentary films ==
Caldicott has appeared in numerous documentary films and television programs. In the early 1980s, she was the subject of two documentaries: the Oscar-nominated 1981 feature-length film Eight Minutes to Midnight: A Portrait of Dr. Helen Caldicott and the 1982 Oscar-winning National Film Board of Canada short documentary, If You Love This Planet.

A 2004 documentary film, Helen's War: Portrait of a Dissident, provides a look into Caldicott's life through the eyes of her niece, filmmaker Anna Broinowski.

Caldicott is featured along with foreign affairs experts, space security activists and military officials in interviews in Denis Delestrac's 2010 feature documentary Pax Americana and the Weaponization of Space.

The 2013 documentary Pandora's Promise also features footage of Caldicott, interspersed with counter-points to her assertions regarding the health impacts of the Chernobyl nuclear disaster.

| Title | Director | Production company | Year |
|---|---|---|---|
| The World Awaits | Don Haderlein | | 2015 (in production) |
| The Oracles of Pennsylvania Avenue | Tim Wilkerson | | 2013 |
| United Natures | Peter Charles Downey | United Natures Independent Media | 2013 |
| Pandora's Promise | Robert Stone | Robert Stone Productions, Vulcan Productions | 2013 |
| Democracy Now! (TV Series) | | Democracy Now | 2011 |
| The University of Nuclear Bombs | Mohamed Elsawi, Joshua James | | 2010 |
| Pax Americana and the Weaponization of Space | Denis Delestrac | Coptor Productions Inc., Lowik Media | 2009 |
| Difference of Opinion (TV Series) | | Australian Broadcasting Corporation | 2007 |
| Poison Dust | Sue Harris | | 2005 |
| Fatal Fallout: The Bush Legacy | Gary Null | Gary Null Moving Pictures | 2004 |
| Helen's War: Portrait of a Dissident | Anna Broinowski | | 2004 |
| American Experience (TV documentary) | | WGBH | 1998 |
| In Our Hands | Robert Richter, Stanley Warnow | | 1984 |
| If You Love This Planet (short) | Terri Nash | National Film Board of Canada | 1982 |
| Eight Minutes to Midnight: A Portrait of Dr. Helen Caldicott | Mary Benjamin | | 1981 |
| We are the Guinea Pigs | Joan Harvey | | 1980 |

== See also ==
- Antimilitarism
- Anti-nuclear movement in Australia
- Anti-nuclear movement in the United States
- List of peace activists
- Nuclear weapons of the United States
- Nuclear-free zone
- Nuclear-weapon-free zone
- Treaty of Rarotonga
- Akhtar Naraghi – founder of the International Organization of the Helen Prize for Women, named for Helen Caldicott
