= Religious America =

PBS documentary series

Religious America was a 1974 American television documentary series produced for the Public Broadcasting Service (PBS) television station WGBH-TV in Boston and covered various religious communities in the United States. The series producer was produced Philip Garvin and directed by Boyd Estus and Philip Garvin. The show included 13 weekly episodes.

== List of Religious America episodes ==
Program Number	Episode	Title	Directed by	Original release date
101	1	"Meeting In The Air"	Boyd Estus & Philip Garvin	1974
This episode explores the religious life at Faith Tabernacle Church in Riverside, California, a Pentecostal congregation.
102	2	"POW"	Boyd Estus & Philip Garvin	1974
This episode explores the faith of a pilot who was captured during the Vietnam War arrives home and is reacquainted with his family.
103	3	"Lubavitch"	Boyd Estus & Philip Garvin	1974
This episode explores Hasidic life in Brooklyn, New York. The episode covers the daily life of a Hasidic man associated with the Chabad-Lubavitch movement and focused on Hasidic ritual seclusion from the non-Hasidic society. The production of the episode elicited a critical response from the Chabad-Lubavitch Hasidic movement.
104	4	"Lighthouse in Loleta"	Boyd Estus & Philip Garvin	1974
This episodes explores the Lighthouse Ranch, a Christian commune of 130 young people, in Loleta, California.
105	5	"Koinonia"	Boyd Estus & Philip Garvin	1974
This episode explores the outreach activities of the Koinonia Missionary Baptist Church, located in Gary, Indiana, founded in 1971.
106	6	"Vina"	Boyd Estus & Philip Garvin	1974
This episode explores the life choices of an American monk at the Abbey of New Clairvaux, a Trappist monastery in Vina, California.
107	7	"Kundalini"	Boyd Estus & Philip Garvin	1974
This episode explores the world of the Guru Ram Das Ashram commune in rural Massachusetts. The members practice Kundalini Yoga and Sikhism.
108	8	"Meet Me in Galilee"	Boyd Estus & Philip Garvin	1974
Meet me in the Galilee explores the lives of the members of the St. James Episcopal Church, a prominent parish in New York City founded in 1810.
109	9	"Crow River Christmas"	Boyd Estus & Philip Garvin	1974
Crow River Christmas explores the religious life of a farming family in Knapp, Minnesota and the North Crow River Lutheran Church which was founded by Swedish immigrants in 1870.
110	10	"Louise"	Boyd Estus & Philip Garvin	1974
This episode explores the religious life in the small town of Louise, Mississippi.
111	11	"Resurrection"	Boyd Estus & Philip Garvin	1974
A fifteen-year-old marriage is renewed at the Old Mission Plaza Church, the oldest church in Los Angeles, and the religious center for local Mexican-Americans.
112	12	"Reba"	Boyd Estus & Philip Garvin	1974
A young family joins the Reba Place Fellowship, a small Christian community in Evanston, Illinois.
113	13	"Jim"	Boyd Estus & Philip Garvin	1974
This episode explores the religious sentiment of a man in Hanson, Massachusetts. James "Jim" Lewis is 36 years old and considers himself religious despite not attending church.
