= Edith Burnside =

Australian charity worker (1889–1992)

Dame Edith Burnside DBE (née Edwards; 1889 – 10 May 1992) was an Australian charity worker. She was involved with numerous organisations and causes.

== Early life ==
Burnside was born as Edith Edwards in Melbourne in 1889, and was educated at St Michael's Grammar School.

== Public life ==
Burnside was president of the Royal Melbourne Hospital's Almoner Ambulance from 1952. She served on the boards or committees of the Yooralla Hospital School, the National Gallery Society of Victoria, the Australia-Japan Society of Victoria, and the Australian Elizabethan Theatre Trust.

She was the president of the Central Council of Auxiliaries of Prince Henry's Hospital and led committees to raise funds for various causes, including disabled children.

Burnside was appointed an Officer of the Order of the British Empire (OBE) in the 1957 New Year Honours. She was later elevated to Dame Commander of the Order of the British Empire (DBE) for "services to hospitals and the community", as the only Australian woman to be made a dame in the 1976 New Year Honours.

Outside of her charitable activities, Burnside was a branch treasurer of the Australian Women's National League (AWNL) and a director of her husband's business.

== Personal life ==
She married businessman William Kennedy Burnside in 1913, with whom she had two children. Her son, Kennedy Burnside, was a prominent surgeon, and her grandson was Julian Burnside, a prominent human rights lawyer.

Dame Edith Burnside died on 10 May 1992.
