= Helen's War: Portrait of a Dissident =

2004 documentary film

- Directed by: Anna Broinowski
- Written by: Anna Broinowski
- Produced by: Sonja Armstrong; Anne Pick
- Cinematography: Dennis Beauchamp; Steve Broadhurst; Kathryn Milliss
- Edited by: Ruth Cullen; Steve Weslak
- Music by: Dave Klotz; Guy Zerafa
- Release date: 2004
- Running time: 52 minutes
- Countries: Canada; Australia
- Language: English

Helen's War: Portrait of a Dissident is a 2004 documentary film directed by Anna Broinowski. It's about Dr Helen Caldicott, an anti-nuclear campaigner.

== Production ==
The movie is a Canadian-Australian co-production. Filmmaker Broinowski follows her Aunt, Caldicott, during a promotional tour for her book The New Nuclear Danger.

== Reception ==
The Sydney Morning Herald's Greg Hassal writes "Making this documentary was clearly difficult for both subject and filmmaker, but the results are stunning."

== Awards ==
- 2004 Australian Film Institute Awards
  - Best Direction in a Documentary - Anna Broinowski - won
  - Best Documentary - nominated
