= World Vision Australia =

Christian aid and development organization

- Founded: 1966
- Founder: World Vision (USA)
- Type: Non-Government Organisation
- Purpose: Well-being of all people, especially children.
- Location: Melbourne, Australia (World Vision Australia Support Office)
- Region served: 38 countries
- Method: Transformational Development through emergency relief, community development and policy and advocacy
- Key people: Grant Bayldon CEO
- Revenue: A$583.6 million (2019)
- Employees: 372 (2020)
- Website: www.worldvision.com.au

World Vision Australia (WVA) is an all-embracing Christian non-governmental organisation based in Melbourne, Australia. It is a part of the World Vision International Partnership led by World Vision International. WVA is Australia's largest overseas aid and development organisation, operating primarily to assist overseas communities living in poverty. It also carries out development work in Australia with First Nations communities.

WVA is registered as a charity by the Australian Charities and Not-For-Profits Commission as a public benevolent institution, and is endorsed as a deductible gift recipient.

== History ==
World Vision was founded in 1950 in the United States by Rev. Robert Pierce, a Baptist missionary who had worked in China, focusing on aiding children in need. The first child sponsorship scheme commenced in 1953 to aid children in Korea following the Korean war and subsequently established in other countries.

WVA was founded in 1966 after a proposal to start a new office in Australia by Bernard Barron, the head of World Vision Canada, and after startup funds were provided by the headquarters of World Vision in the United States. Graeme Irvine, an evangelical Christian, was at the head of the Australian branch of World Vision. The first project of WVA related to Vietnam.

World Vision International was founded in 1977 to restructure the World Vision organisation worldwide, and the head of WVA, Graeme Irvine, was among the signers of the Declaration of Internationalization in 1978, which declared a set of objectives for World Vision in its operations throughout the world. In 1988, Graeme Irvine became the first non-American president of World Vision International.

After its establishment, WVA first focused on meeting the needs of refugees in Indochina and of people recovering from disasters in Bangladesh and in several African countries. In the 1970s, its focus broadened from assisting the individual child to include community development. Since the 1980s, a "welfare" approach has gradually changed to a more collaborative relationship where communities work alongside World Vision to improve their lives and take control of their futures.

== Christian foundation ==
World Vision Australia, like all branches of World Vision, is a Christian organisation that bases its beliefs and its activities on the Christian faith and draws on a biblical framework to inform its work. The Declaration of Internationalization referred to above included a Statement of Faith that set the theological framework within which World Vision International and its national offices (including WVA) operate. The Statement of Faith corresponds to the Statement of Faith put forward by the US National Association of Evangelicals as standard for their evangelical convictions. Like other members of the World Vision Partnership, WVA does not make Christian belief or observance a condition of providing assistance to a person or community, but provides aid regardless of the recipient's religion or beliefs. WVA is a signatory to the ACFID Code of Conduct, that requires that development activities be separately delivered and reported from non-development (including religious) activities. WVA's development activities seek to improve the well-being of those in need without favouritism or discrimination by race, religion, culture, or political persuasion.

== Fundraising ==
In the 2020 financial year, World Vision Australia reported raising AU$587.9 million; $306.6 million from cash donations and grants, and $281.3 million from non-monetary donations and gifts. In the same reporting year they disbursed AU$589.1 million, of which $522.8 million went to development programming and $66.3 million on overheads.

In the 2017 financial year, World Vision Australia reported total income of $404.1 million, derived from child sponsorship (38%), Australian Government (DFAT) grants (12%), appeals, donations and gifts (9%), overseas grants (11%) and other cash revenue (6%). Non-monetary donations and gifts were received to the value of $98.7 million or 24% of total revenue.

Overseas grants are received from philanthropic organisations, other government aid programs and United Nations agencies such as the World Food Programme, UNICEF and UNHCR (responsible for children and refugees).

=== Child sponsorship ===
World Vision's main focus is the well-being of children, and child sponsorship programs provide its greatest source of funds. Sponsorship links the donor to a specific child or children overseas and the sponsor makes a long-term commitment to contribute regular amounts (usually monthly). Money donated by the sponsor does not go directly to the child or the child's family; instead it goes to an Area Development Plan (ADP) that benefits the entire community in which the child lives. Not every child in an area benefitted by an ADP may be sponsored; children are selected for sponsorship who are considered to be in positions of particular vulnerability.

=== 40 Hour Famine ===
The "40 Hour Famine" is a fund-raising scheme in which Australians, especially the young, find out what it is like to go without food for 40 hours. Schools and churches support of the famine and participants ask others to sponsor them. In 2017 and 2018, a "Backpack Challenge" was held in place of the 40 Hour Famine with participants to only make use of what they can carry in a backpack for 40 hours. The campaign is intended to draw attention to the plight of refugees around the world.

== Programs ==
=== Worldwide focus ===
In the financial year 2017, cash disbursements provided by WVA to international programs totalled $A229.3 million. Expenditure by region (including non-cash expenditure) comprised $A115.1 million for programs in Africa, $A73.5 million in the Middle East and Eastern Europe, $A69.2 million in the Asia Pacific area (not including Australia), and $A15.1 million in Latin America.

=== Disaster management ===
WVA funds are used in part for responses to humanitarian disasters throughout the world. The emergencies may be rapid and slow onset natural disasters such as earthquakes, floods, tsunamis and droughts, or man-made disasters such as conflicts and war and humanitarian emergencies caused by political, social, economic and other factors across a single country or a group of countries, in urban or non-urban settings.

As at June 2018, WVA funds were being used to respond to emergencies in East Africa (including South Sudan), the Democratic Republic of Congo, Syria, Myanmar and Bangladesh (Rohingya crisis) and Afghanistan (drought). World Vision International coordinates responses to disasters in accordance with its Disaster Management 2020 (DM 2020) approach. This is focussed on the needs of children, who usually comprise 50–60% of the victims of a disaster. DM 2020 is directed to a number of different but related aspects of disaster management, including –

- Early warning
- Disaster risk reduction
- Preparedness (including maintenance of stocks of emergency equipment and supplies)
- Recovery (following a disaster)
- Transition (return to normal life)

=== Transformational development ===
“Transformational Development” is the expression used by WVA to describe “a holistic approach to improving the lives of the poor by recognising people's physical, social, spiritual, economic and political needs.”

Money raised by WVA is used to fund development projects aimed primarily at improving the lives of children. As the problems experienced by children most often arise out of the circumstances in which they live, development projects are designed to improve those circumstances, benefitting not only the children but all those who live in the area being assisted.

Development assistance is directed to the matters that are most significant in the community concerned, and includes projects to –

- Provide access to clean water and sanitation
- Provide access to health services and education about health and nutrition
- Assist in improving agricultural techniques and increasing agricultural output
- Provide education for all children
- Support increased income generation.

World Vision does not provide development assistance to a community unless it has previously obtained the consent of that community. World Vision development assistance programs are delivered over the long-term, i.e., up to ten years or longer, and members of the local community are involved throughout. The aim is for the programs and practices introduced by World Vision to continue under the control of the local community after World Vision itself has departed.

The above principles are set out and explained in the World Vision International Handbook for Development Programmes.

=== Australia ===
World Vision Australia offers educational resources, which include general topic sheets and classroom materials for primary and secondary levels.

WVA advocates on a range of local and international issues relevant to Australia (for example by making submissions to Parliament). It also encourages supporters to lobby the Australian government on issues such as campaigns against landmines, child labour, child soldiers and debt.

==== Australia First Nations program ====
World Vision Australia collaborates with Aboriginal and Torres Strait Islander communities to focus on three strategic priorities as part of its Australia Program:

1. Education for Life: Education focused projects supporting particularly children and young adults;
2. Systemic change: Collaborating with Indigenous communities, government and others to influence positive systemic change, and
3. Reconciliation: Mobilising Australians to actively support the reconciliation movement.

World Vision Australia draws on its international development experience to implement long term, place-based community development initiatives. Its programming includes:

- Early childhood care and development programs in the Pilbara and Kimberley region of Western Australia;
- The Martu Leadership Program being delivered in partnership with Kanyirninpa Jukurrpa in the Pilbara;
- Young Mob Leadership Programs supporting Aboriginal students in selected New South Wales and Victorian schools; and
- The Channels of Hope program, which is addressing the root causes of domestic violence, through programs in faith-based communities in Queensland and the Northern Territory.

New projects commencing in 2018 will support the development of literacy and work-ready skills among young people in remote communities.

== Partnerships ==
First of all World Vision Australia is member of the World Vision Partnership.

World Vision Australia is a full member of the Australian Council for International Development (ACFID), and is a signatory to ACFID's Code of Conduct, which defines the minimum standards of governance, management and accountability for development NGOs. It works in cooperation with other government and non-government agencies in Australia and overseas. In addition to AusAID funding, World Vision Australia makes submissions regarding government policies relating to aid and development.

The organisation works with local and overseas churches, and with organisations such as the World Health Organization, UNHCR and UNICEF. World Vision Australia also collaborates with Oxfam. support and advocate for the work of World Vision. The Ambassadors are drawn from Australia's elite athletes, actors, journalists and performers and include the international actor Hugh Jackman and former Australian Test Cricket captain Adam Gilchrist.

== Criticism regarding activities in Palestine ==
In February 2012, the Israel Law Center notified World Vision Australia that it support of the Union of Agricultural Work Committees (UAWC) could be being redirected to the Popular Front for the Liberation of Palestine, which is a designated terrorist organization in Australia. WVA "suspended its dealings" with the UAWC pending an outcome of the investigation. WVA resumed working with UAWC after AusAID and World Vision found the allegations were unfounded. The Israel Law Center considers World Vision's response to be a whitewash and maintains that the allegations have not been refuted.

In 2013 WVA was criticised for funding a soccer field in Jenin in the West Bank that was named after a former militant PLO leader. WVA maintained that the field had a different (non-controversial) name, and that the naming of the area surrounding the soccer field after the PLO leader was done by Palestinian authorities after construction and naming of the field had been completed.

In August 2016, in response to the June 2016 arrest of Mohammad El Halabi, manager of World Vision in Gaza, by the Israeli authorities on charges of misappropriating funds, the Australian Department of Foreign Affairs and Trade immediately suspended all funding of Palestinian programs by World Vision. World Vision Australia chief executive, Tim Costello, accepted this move as being the correct thing to do pending a proper investigation of the allegations. A review of the Australian government came to the conclusion that no Australian taxpayer money was misappropriated.

== Executive remuneration ==
World Vision Australia is currently not transparent about executive remuneration. In the 2023 annual report, the following is stated: "The Company’s senior leaders are paid in accordance with the Company’s remuneration policy". The only dollar figure disclosed is for the total, 'Key Management Personnel remuneration': $2.648 million. This was an increase of $0.378 million over the previous year. The last annual report to reveal the salary of the CEO was for 2021. There were three CEOs that year due to changes: the total salary paid out to CEOs was $346,771. In 2020, there were two CEOs: the total salary paid out was $527,395. In 2019, there was one CEO: the remuneration was $374,934.
