= Aveo Group =

Australian senior living company

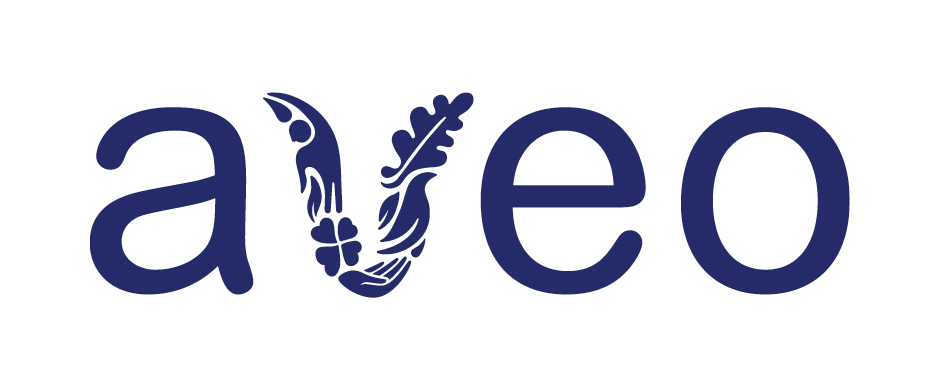
- Company type: Subsidiary
- Industry: Real estate
- Founded: 1970
- Key people: Tony Randello (Chief Executive Officer); Natalie Patterson (Chief Operating Officer)
- Products: Independent living, Assisted living
- Number of employees: 2000 (November 2021)
- Parent: The Living Company
- Website: aveo.com.au

Aveo Group is an Australian company, owned by The Living Company. It is the owner, operator and manager of 67 retirement communities across the eastern coast of Australia. Aveo retirement communities are located in Queensland, New South Wales, Victoria and Tasmania. Aveo provides retirement living choices for over 10,000 residents. Aveo has corporate offices in Sydney, Brisbane and Melbourne.

== History ==
Aveo was established in 1970.

Aveo Newstead, Brisbane's first integrated retirement living community, won the Nettletontribe Award for Design Award at the 2018 Property Council's Retirement Living Awards.

In November 2019, shareholders approved a $1.3 billion takeover offer by Brookfield Asset Management and Aveo was delisted from the ASX.

In 2025, Aveo was purchased by Scape Australia (later renamed The Living Company) for A$3.85 billion.

== Class action lawsuit ==
In 2017, a class action was lodged against Aveo alleging its resident contracts involved unconscionable and misleading conduct. The class action attracted publicity when the lead lawyer, Stewart Levitt, was accused of misleading the residents and the law firm running the class action, Levitt Robinson, was ordered to remove their ads promoting the class action. It was the first-ever case where a Contradictor (similar to an Intervenor) was appointed as an amicus over an opt-out notice. The barrister appointed as Contradictor advised clients not to join the class action.

Aveo vigorously fought the allegations. The matter was settled in March 2023 with Aveo agreeing to a payment of $11 million, without making any admission of liability. Levitt Robinson released a statement withdrawing the case and acknowledging that "the introduction and implementation by Aveo and its related entities of Aveo Way contracts were lawful, in accordance with industry standards" and expressing "regret for any distress or anxiety which Aveo residents and staff have experienced as a result of or incidental to the Aveo class action litigation." Federal Court Justice Bernard Murphy subsequently described their handling of the case as "seriously derelict" and "beggaring belief", ruling that Levitt Robinson failed to act "with the efficiency and care [that] was legally required" and that this prevented an earlier settlement being reached. Murphy reduced the fees Levitt Robinson could retrieve from the settlement by $2.5 million, and commented that "the unfortunate reality [for the plaintiffs] is that their case was weak and always likely to fail."
