= Boyd Estus =

American film director

Boyd Estus is a director of photography and producer/director in the motion picture industry whose credits include the Academy Award-winning The Flight of the Gossamer Condor, the Academy Award-nominated Eight Minutes to Midnight, and many Emmy-winning television programs. He has worked on location around the world shooting and directing feature films and documentaries.

== Career ==
Boyd Estus has extensive experience in the production of film documentaries dealing with history, music, and science. An innovator in the development of technique of "docu-drama" for compelling storytelling, Estus is known for making his subjects vivid and understandable to a broad audience.

Boyd Estus has received numerous awards including the CINE Golden Eagle (Where the Galaxies Are, Arthur Fiedler--Just Call Me Maestro, Flight of the Gossamer Condor), Melbourne International Film Festival Kino Award (So Many Galaxies...So Little Time), the Peabody Award (NOVA, Tender Places), the Cindy, Emmy, Telly, Hugo Award, and many others.

In addition to making films for the BBC and other overseas broadcasters, Estus has made many films for American broadcast television including the National Geographic Society, the Smithsonian Institution, the History Channel, the Discovery Channel, and PBS television where he was a founding member of the film unit at WGBH Boston.

== Filmography ==
=== American Experience (PBS) ===
- Murder at Harvard
- Annie Oakley
- Streamliner
- Secrets of a Master Builder (James Eads)
- Houdini
- Ulysses S. Grant
- Public Enemy #1: Dillinger
- Alone on the Ice (Admiral Byrd)
- Reconstruction
- Golden Gate Bridge

=== Frontline (PBS) ===
- Apocalypse (BBC co-production)
- The O.J. Verdict
- Harvest of Fear (NOVA co-prod.)
- From Jesus to Christ (BBC co-prod.)
- Exonerated
- Organ Farm
- Commanding Heights (BBC co-prod.)

=== NOVA (PBS) ===
- Typhoid Mary: The Most Dangerous Woman in America
- Pharaoh's Obelisk (Secrets of Lost Empires)
- Search for a Safe Cigarette
- Survivor MD (sub-series)
- China Bridge (Secrets of Lost Empires)
- Deadly Shadow of Vesuvius
- Cut to the Heart
- Kidnapped by UFO’s?
- Medieval Siege (Secrets of Lost Empires)
- Roman Bath (Secrets of Lost Empires)
- So You Want to be a Doctor?
- Animal Hospital
- Eclipse of the Century

=== PBS Television ===
- Benjamin Franklin
- The Real Louisa May Alcott
- Woody Guthrie: I Ain’t Got No Home
- Antiques Roadshow FYI
- At Home in Utopia
- The Powder and the Glory
- Some Kinda Funny "Porto Rican"?
- The New Medicine
- NOW (PBS Public Affairs)
- Earthbound
- Religious America
- The Navigators: Pathfinders of the Pacific

=== National Educational Television; WGBH ===
- Between Time and Timbuktu

=== BBC, Channel 4 (UK), et al. ===
- History of Soul Music
- Hiroshima
- Together On Broadway (Kiri Te Kanawa & André Previn)
- ABBA
- The Big Fight
- Heaven & Earth (James Taylor)
- Me and Uncle Sam
- Three Tales (Steve Reich)
- The British Empire (American Revolution)
- DNA (NOVA co-prod.)
- Angry America (A&E co-prod.)

=== History Channel + Discovery Channel + HBO ===
- The Conquerors: General William Howe
- Forensics of the Bible
- Anything2Win
- Hitler’s Last Book
- Prophets of Science Fiction
- Shay’s Rebellion
- Breaking Vegas
- Armageddon
- George Washington & The Generals
- TR – An American Lion
- Unsolved History: Forensic Presidents, Salem...Witch Trials, Aztec, Pearl Harbor
- History’s Mysteries: The Strange Case of Lizzie Borden
- The American Presidency
- Brilliant Minds
- Amazing Medical
- Stealth and Beyond
- Boomer Nation
- Hope Diamond
- Miracle Hunters
- The Real JAG’s
- Reel Sex
- Breathing Room
- Unsolved Mysteries (NBC, CBS, Lifetime)
- Building the New MFA
