= Josh Bornstein =

Australian lawyer

Josh Bornstein is an Australian lawyer specialising in employment and labour relations law who has acted in several high-profile legal matters. He is a member of the Board of think tank, The Australia Institute and the advisory board of the Centre for Employment and Labour Relations Law at the University of Melbourne. He is also head of Industrial Relations at Maurice Blackburn Lawyers, is deputy Chair of the Racing Appeals and Disciplinary Board. He is President of Tzedek.org, an advocacy organisation for victims of child sexual abuse within the Jewish community in Australia. Bornstein regularly represents women who have been subject to bullying or sexual harassment in the workplace. In 2021, Bornstein ran for preselection to represent the Australian Labor Party. Bornstein withdrew from the nomination following an article by The Australian. Bornstein is said to be considering a second attempt at running for the senate.

He is ranked as Victoria's top employment lawyer by Doyle's Guide to the Australian Legal Profession, 2013 edition.

== Cases in which Bornstein has been involved include ==
- Representing two women sexually harassed by Peter Vickery
- Representing the Australian Workers' Union and Larry Knight's family over the Beaconsfield mine collapse
- Representing Australian Council of Trade Unions and Ansett Australia employees over the insolvency of the Ansett group of companies
- Assisting the Maritime Union of Australia defeat Patrick Stevedores in the High Court (see also 1998 Australian waterfront dispute)
- Representing the Wilderness Society who were sued by Gunns Limited
- Representing the Speaker of the House of Representatives, Peter Slipper, in pursuing an abuse of process case against James Ashby.
- Representing Essendon Football Club in its challenge to the legality of the ASADA investigation.
- Representing Antoinette Lattouf in Federal Court proceedings against the Australian Broadcasting Corporation (ABC), establishing that ABC had illegally sacked her because of political opinion.

He has publicly campaigned for the introduction of a national workplace bullying law and for a Royal Commission to be established into institutional child sexual abuse.
