= Eight Minutes to Midnight: A Portrait of Dr. Helen Caldicott =

1981 film

- Directed by: Mary Benjamin; Boyd Estus
- Produced by: Mary Benjamin; Boyd Estus; Susanne Simpson
- Starring: Helen Caldicott
- Cinematography: Boyd Estus
- Distributed by: Direct Cinema
- Release date: 1981
- Running time: 60 minutes
- Country: United States
- Language: English

Eight Minutes to Midnight: A Portrait of Dr. Helen Caldicott is a 1981 American documentary film about anti-nuclear weapons activist Helen Caldicott, directed by Mary Benjamin and Boyd Estus. It was nominated for an Academy Award for Best Documentary Feature.

== Summary ==
The film follows Caldicott speaking at Washington D.C. rally, visits Three Mile Island and addresses Australian uranium workers.

== Reception ==
Both Gene Siskel and Roger Ebert each gave it a negative review and thought that the film's intention was noble but the filmmaking was pedestrian.

== See also ==
- If You Love This Planet, a 1982 short documentary about Caldicott as well as a radio program of the same name
