= Australian Peace Prize =

Award presented 2006–2009

The Australian Peace Prize was an annual award presented from 2006 to 2009 to an Australian citizen or resident, or to a group based in Australia, for outstanding contributions towards peace. It was awarded by the Peace Organisation of Australia. The first prize was awarded in 2006 to Dr Helen Caldicott. The most recent prize was awarded in 2009.

== Prize winners ==
- 2006: Dr. Helen Caldicott, paediatrician and anti-nuclear campaigner, "for her longstanding commitment to raising awareness about the medical and environmental hazards of the nuclear age".
- 2007: Julian Burnside QC, Melbourne barrister, "for his staunch opposition to mandatory detention and the Pacific Solution, and for doing all in his power to assist refugees fleeing war and persecution in their homelands".
- 2008: Rev. Tim Costello, chief executive of World Vision in Australia, "for his commitment to peace and social justice, in particular for his work on poverty alleviation and gun control".
- 2009: Senator Bob Brown, Federal Parliamentary Leader of the Australian Greens, "in recognition of his longstanding commitment to peace, non-violence and global justice."

== See also ==
- List of peace activists
