= Anna Broinowski =

Australian filmmaker & academic

- Born: 1969 (age 56–57); Tokyo, Japan
- Education: University of Sydney (BA); Macquarie University (PhD)
- Occupations: Film director Academic
- Years active: 1995-present
- Employer: University of Sydney

Anna Broinowski is a Walkley Award-winning documentary filmmaker and author.

Her feature documentaries are Forbidden Lie$, about Chicago hoax author Norma Khouri, cited as one of the best 100 Australian films of the new millennium, Aim High in Creation! (2013), about North Korea's propaganda filmmakers, and Pauline Hanson: Please Explain (2016), about Australian Senator Pauline Hanson.

Broinowski's broadcast documentaries include Helen's War: Portrait of a Dissident, about anti-nuclear activist Dr Helen Caldicott's 2003 campaign against the US-led invasion of Iraq, Heartbeat: the Miracle Inside You, about the latest advances in cardiothoracic surgery and treatment for ABC Catalyst, Hell Bento!!, about the Japanese cultural underground, and Sexing the Label (1996), about Sydney counter-cultures in the mid 1990s.

== Early life ==
Broinowski was born during 1969 in Tokyo, Japan. She is the daughter of Australian diplomat Richard Broinowski and academic Alison Broinowski.

Growing up Broinowski attended schools in Myanmar, Iran, the Philippines, Canberra and Japan.

== Career ==
In 2016, Broinowski won her third AFI/AACTA, for directing Pauline Hanson: Please Explain. Her work has also received an Al Jazeera Golden Award, a NSW Premier's Literary Award, a Dendy, the Rome Film Fest Cult Prize, an Atom Award, the St Petersburg International Media Forum Press Award for Best Film, and the Writers Guild of America (East and West) Best Nonfiction Screenplay award.

Broinowski has written two non-fiction books, Please Explain: the rise, fall and rise again of Pauline Hanson (Penguin 2017), and the Nib Waverley Alex Buzo shortlist prize-winning The Director is the Commander (Penguin 2015) which was released in the USA by Arcade Publishing as Aim High in Creation! in 2016.

In 2016 Broinowski received a PhD from Macquarie University for her thesis on the history of deceptive techniques in documentary filmmaking, inspired by the relationship between filmmaker and subject in Forbidden Lie$.

== Filmography ==
=== Feature films ===
- Hell Bento: Uncovering the Japanese Underground (1995)
- Sexing the Label - Love and Gender in a Queer World (1997)
- Romancing the Chakra (1998)
- Helen's War - Portrait of a Dissident (2004)
- Forbidden Lie$ (2007)
- Aim High in Creation (2013)
- Pauline Hanson: Please Explain! (2016)
- Uluru and the Magician (2021)

=== Short films ===
- Tsunamai (1999)
- Burqa (2003)
- Fish and Chips (2011)
- Kim Jong Il's Cinema Experience (2013) - Interactive Documentary

== Bibliography ==
=== Books ===
- The Director is the Commander (2015) or Aim High in Creation! in the United States
- Please Explain: The Rise, Fall and Rise Again of Pauline Hanson (2017)
- Datsun Angel (2024)
