= Bernard Murphy (judge) =

Australian judge

The Honourable Bernard Michael Murphy
- Incumbent
- Assumed office 14 June 2011

Personal details
- Born: Melbourne, Victoria
- Education: Monash University
- Occupation: Judge, solicitor

Bernard Michael Murphy is a judge of the Federal Court of Australia. He was appointed to the Federal Court in 2011 and was the first solicitor from Victoria to be appointed directly to the Federal Court bench.

== Early life and career ==
Murphy was born in Melbourne, Victoria. He graduated from Monash University with a Bachelor of Jurisprudence and a Bachelor of Laws in 1978. In 1980, he joined Slater and Gordon Lawyers and was admitted to legal practice in Victoria. He practised in common law litigation and industrial relations. Between 1990 and 1995, he served as the senior partner of Slater and Gordon In 1996, he moved to Maurice Blackburn and specialised in class actions, heading the firm's national practice in that area from 1998. He was chairman of the firm between 2005 and 2011.

Murphy was appointed to the Federal Court of Australia in 2011. He was the first solicitor from Victoria to be appointed directly to the Federal Court bench. He is a senior fellow at Melbourne Law School, where he lectures in class action law.

Ahead of his constitutionally-mandated retirement, Murphy was criticised for waiting unusually long to hand down judgements in several cases. In particular, a class action by the shareholders of Brambles Limited had been waiting over 1,300 days since its trial for judgement, and likewise a class action by employees of Domino's had been waiting over 1,200 days.

Murphy is a member of the American Law Institute.
