= Peace Organisation of Australia =

Non-profit and non-religious organisation

The Peace Organisation of Australia was a non-profit and non-religious organisation based in Melbourne, Australia which was active from 2005 to 2009. Its stated objective was the promotion of world peace through education. The organisation was established in May 2005 by a group of students from the University of Melbourne, and its last president was Dr. Aron Paul.

The Peace Organisation of Australia lobbied the Australian Government to support the observance of a global ceasefire on the International Day of Peace. It published the Australian Journal of Peace Studies, with the last issue being published in 2009. In July 2006, it awarded the inaugural Australian Peace Prize to Dr. Helen Caldicott "for her longstanding commitment to raising awareness about the medical and environmental hazards of the nuclear age". The 2007 prize was awarded to Melbourne barrister Julian Burnside QC "for his staunch opposition to mandatory detention and the Pacific solution, and for doing all in his power to assist refugees fleeing war and persecution in their homelands". The Australian Peace Prize has not been awarded since 2009. The Peace Organisation of Australia was opposed to uranium mining, uranium enrichment and nuclear power generation.

== See also ==
- Stop the War Coalition (Australia)
