= Women's Action for New Directions =

Nonprofit organization in the United States

Women's Action for New Directions or WAND is a volunteer-run progressive non-profit organization in the United States with the objective of "building women's political power to advocate for peace and security".

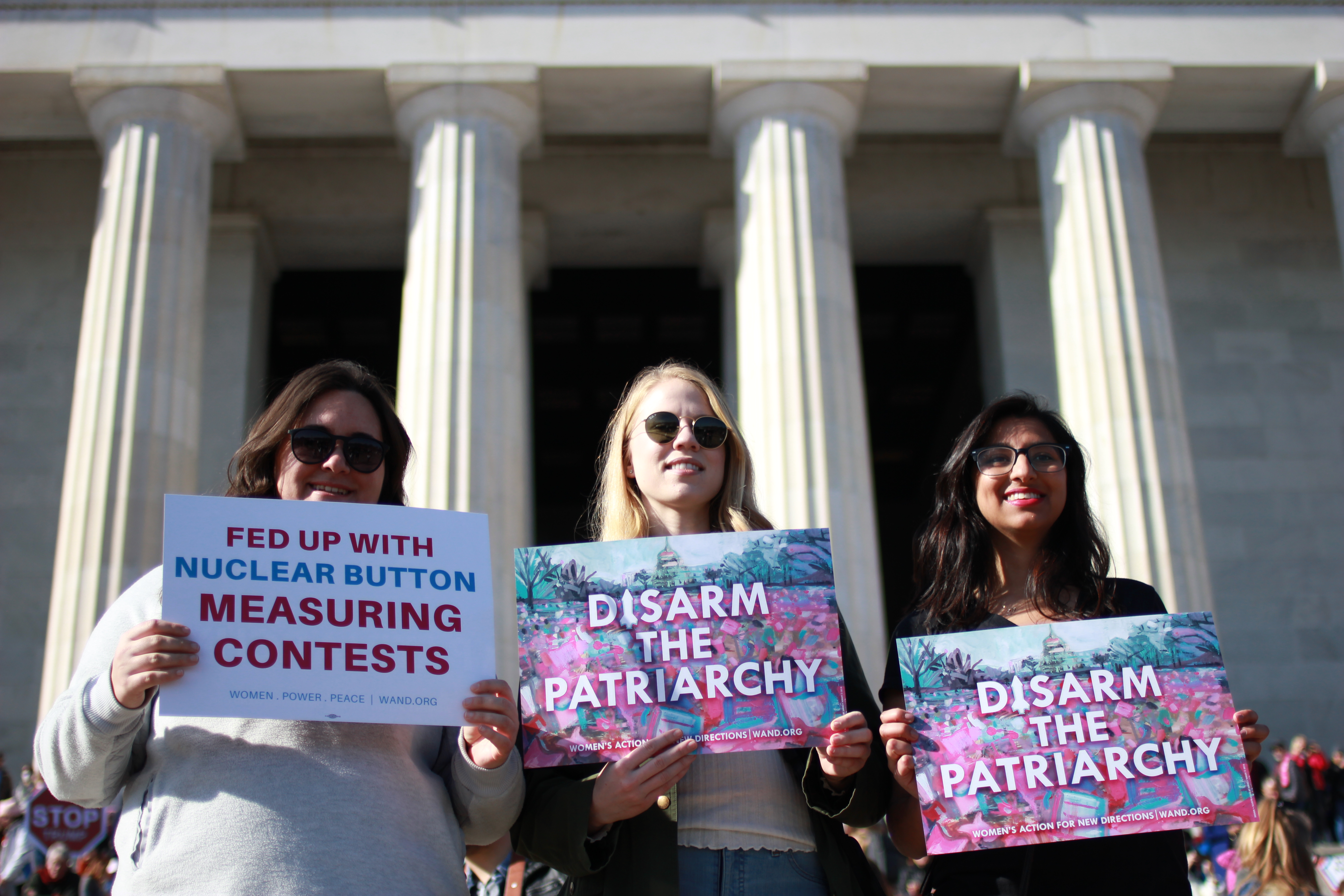
WAND DC Protest

== History ==
In the early 1980s, anti-nuclear activist Helen Caldicott founded the Women's Party for Survival which then gathered around a kitchen table in Cambridge, Massachusetts. The group initially aimed to bring more women into the conversation about nuclear weapons. To expand opportunities for women to take action, WAND was founded in 1982 as Women's Action for Nuclear Disarmament. With the help of thousands of volunteers, the group began educating the public and policymakers about the threat of the arms race and potential policy solutions, eventually opening a second office in Washington, D.C. in 1985. WAND was renamed Women's Action for New Directions in 1991 after the end of the Cold War.

In 1991, WAND created the Women Legislators' Lobby (WiLL), a national network of women state legislators from both parties who work together to influence federal policy. Since 1991, WiLL has tried to include one in every three women legislators in its membership and has representation from all 50 states in the United States. WiLL equips members with timely materials on the impact of federal policy and the federal budget on state programs. WiLL specifically focuses on how the United States’ massive defense budget drains resources that state budgets need to build and maintain strong communities.

Students Take Action for New Directions (STAND) was founded by 13 young women at WAND's 1999 biennial WAND/WiLL national conference. It worked to encourage young women to become politically active, to vote, to network with other young WAND members and with WiLL members, and to become activists working toward WAND's goals. STAND became inactive in the early 2000s.

== Mission ==
WAND builds women's political power to advocate for security and peace with justice. WAND also believes that women are able to shift a militarized, patriarchal culture. WAND works to promote diplomacy and demilitarize U.S. foreign policy, elevate women's voices in conversations about national security policy, and educate and engage women legislators and Members of Congress on peace and security issues. In order to achieve a safer and more secure world, WAND's focus included, but was not limited to (1) eliminating the threat of nuclear war; (2) ensuring women's voices are integrated into peacebuilding agendas; and (3) advocating for a federal budget that promotes diplomacy and rejects defense spending that comes at the expense of everyday Americans.

One of WAND's latest projects was the Disarm the Patriarchy Handbook, a tool that teaches young women about the history of nuclear security policy and how they can get involved to reduce the threat posed by nuclear weapons. The Handbook aims to empower women to hold their elected officials accountable and build a grassroots movement to end the threat of nuclear war.

== Organizational structure ==
=== Women Legislators' Lobby ===
The Women Legislators' Lobby (WiLL) is a network of female state legislators which works to influence federal policy and budget priorities. Since 1993, WiLL has hosted biennial policy conferences in Washington, DC which bring together state and federal legislators, executive branch members, policy experts, and community leaders. Training workshops, policy briefings, and professional development programs help legislators to become more effective at home and to strengthen working relationships with their Congressional colleagues. Throughout the year various training opportunities are offered in state capitals around the country, in Washington, and via webinar. Georgia State Senator Nan Grogan Orrock is the current president of WiLL.

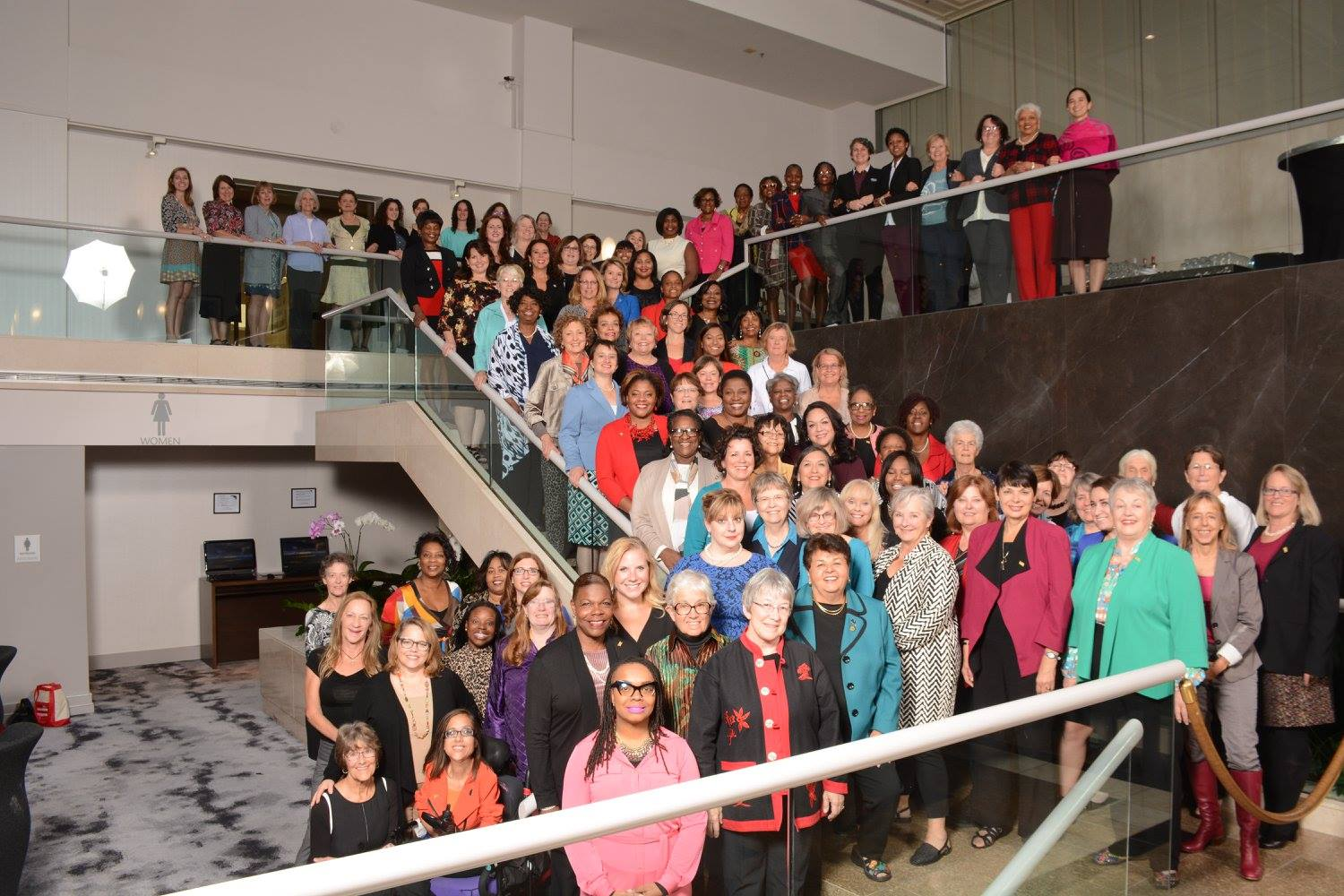
WiLL members at the 2017 National Conference in DC

Former WiLL members have become governors and members of the U. S. Congress. In the 115th Congress, 20 members come from the ranks of WiLL.

=== WAND Education Fund ===
WAND Education Fund was WAND's tax-deductible arm. The Education Fund worked to achieve the organization's goals by educating the public and opinion leaders about the organization's issues.

=== WAND PAC ===
WAND PAC was a political action committee of WAND members that supported members who were running for the United States Congress. To donate to WAND PAC, you had to be a member of WAND. In the PAC's early years, WAND endorsed and donated to non-members that supported the organizations goals. However, with the increase in members running for office in the 1990s WAND decided to concentrate resources solely on their members running for office.

=== Local chapters ===
WAND had chapters in Georgia, Arkansas, and Oregon.
