= Physicians for Social Responsibility =

Non-profit organization in the United States

- Abbreviation: PSR
- Formation: 1961
- Founder: Bernard Lown; Victor W. Sidel; H. Jack Geiger; Sidney Alexander; Alexander Leaf
- Type: Nonprofit organization
- Headquarters: Washington, D.C., United States
- President: Ankush Bansal
- Executive Director: Brian Campbell
- Award: Nobel Peace Prize (1985, shared with IPPNW)
- Website: psr.org

Physicians for Social Responsibility (PSR) is a physician-led nonprofit organization in the United States working to protect public health from the threats of nuclear weapons, climate change, and environmental toxins. Founded in 1961, PSR produces and disseminates publications, provides specialized training, offers written and oral testimony to Congress, conducts media interviews, and delivers professional and public education on nuclear disarmament, climate policy, and environmental health issues. The organization operates through its national office, state and local chapters, and student network, which together form a nationwide network addressing threats to global health and security, including nuclear warfare, nuclear proliferation, climate change, and toxic degradation of the environment.

As the U.S. affiliate of International Physicians for the Prevention of Nuclear War (IPPNW), PSR shared in the 1985 Nobel Peace Prize awarded to IPPNW "for spreading authoritative information and by creating an awareness of the catastrophic consequences of atomic warfare."

== History ==
=== Founding (1961-1973) ===
PSR was founded in Boston in 1961 by a group of physicians concerned about the public health dangers of nuclear weapons testing, stockpiling, and use. The founding physicians included Bernard Lown, Victor W. Sidel, Sidney Alexander, H. Jack Geiger, Alexander Leaf, Charles Magraw, George Saxton, Robert Goldwyn, and Bernard Leon Winter. The group was inspired to act following a 1961 talk by Nobel laureate Sir Philip Noel-Baker on the health effects of nuclear weapons development, in which he warned about strontium-90 found in children's teeth near testing sites at levels 50 times higher than earlier baselines.

PSR's initial work focused on documenting the health consequences of nuclear weapons. The organization's early reports described the human, physical, social, and environmental consequences of nuclear war. PSR opposed atmospheric nuclear testing by demonstrating the presence of strontium-90, a radioactive byproduct of nuclear testing, in children's teeth.

In May 1962, PSR published a landmark series of articles titled "The Medical Consequences of Thermonuclear War" in a special issue of the New England Journal of Medicine. The articles, written by the PSR Study Group, detailed the catastrophic medical consequences that would result from nuclear war. An accompanying editorial argued that physicians had a special responsibility to help prevent the use of nuclear weapons.

The series of articles and PSR's continued advocacy contributed to the signing of the Limited Nuclear Test Ban Treaty in 1963, in which the United States, United Kingdom, and Soviet Union agreed to cease atmospheric nuclear testing. PSR also published The Fallen Sky: Medical Consequences of Thermonuclear War in 1963.

By 1973, the organization had become largely inactive and in effect ceased to exist.

=== Revival (1978-1985) ===
In 1978, Helen Caldicott, an Australian pediatrician working in the cystic fibrosis unit at Children's Hospital Medical Center in Boston, was asked by Arnold Relman, the then-editor of the New England Journal of Medicine, to write an article on the medical dangers of nuclear power. She was subsequently visited by a young intern from Cambridge City Hospital who asked for relevant papers on nuclear power. After discussion, Caldicott suggested starting a medical organization to address the issue. The first meeting was held a week later at the Boston home of Helen and Bill Caldicott, with several physicians in attendance including Richard Feinbloom, who had been the secretary of the original PSR. Rather than incorporating a new organization, Feinbloom suggested the group adopt the name of the defunct Physicians for Social Responsibility, and they did.

The revived PSR quickly gained momentum. One of its initial organizational actions was to place an advertisement in the New England Journal of Medicine outlining the medical implications of nuclear power. The advertisement was serendipitously published the day after the Three Mile Island accident in March 1979, which drew significant attention and attracted 500 new members. PSR membership grew from 300 to 5,000 members in just two weeks following Three Mile Island. Over the next five years, PSR recruited 23,000 physician members and organized approximately 150 chapters across the United States.

Caldicott served as president from 1978 to 1984, when she resigned. During her tenure, she traveled extensively and established similar physicians' organizations in England, Ireland, Scotland, Japan, New Zealand, Canada, the Netherlands, Germany, Belgium, Scandinavia, and Australia.

=== International expansion ===
PSR's work to educate the public about the dangers of nuclear war grew into an international movement. In 1980, Bernard Lown co-founded the International Physicians for the Prevention of Nuclear War (IPPNW) with Evgeni Chazov of the Soviet Union, with PSR as its American affiliate. IPPNW expanded globally to include branches in many nations, continuing PSR's educational mission on an international scale. By 1985, IPPNW represented 135,000 physicians in 60 countries.

That year, IPPNW received the Nobel Peace Prize, which PSR shared as the U.S. affiliate. The award recognized the organization "for spreading authoritative information and by creating an awareness of the catastrophic consequences of atomic warfare." On December 10, 1985, Lown and Chazov accepted the award on behalf of IPPNW.

== Programs and activities ==
=== Nuclear weapons and security ===
PSR's security program works to improve national policy formulation and decision-making about nuclear weapons and technology through the combined efforts of health professionals and concerned citizens. The organization articulates both the health threats and the security threats posed by nuclear weapons, emphasizing the importance of implementing new approaches to reduce U.S. reliance on nuclear weapons in national security policy. PSR advocates for the ultimate elimination of nuclear weapons.

PSR's work is grounded in the medical consensus that there could be no adequate medical response in the aftermath of nuclear war and that prevention is the only meaningful public health approach.

PSR has advocated for the extension of the New Strategic Arms Reduction Treaty between the United States and Russia and supports the "Back from the Brink" campaign urging U.S. government actions to prevent nuclear war. Local chapters have successfully persuaded numerous city and county legislatures to endorse the campaign.

Since the 2016 presidential election, PSR leaders have written opinion pieces in major newspapers critiquing policies regarding nuclear weapons and climate change. In 2025, former PSR president Ira Helfand appeared on Democracy Now! to discuss nuclear weapons policy, emphasizing that "we are facing the gravest danger of nuclear war that has existed on the planet since the end of the Cold War."

=== Climate change and environment ===
Since formally creating its environment and health program in 1992, PSR has worked to address climate change and the toxic degradation of the environment. The organization advocates for policies to curb climate change, generate a sustainable energy future, minimize toxic pollution of air, food and drinking water, and prevent human exposure to toxic substances.

PSR's "Code Black" program has been a voice in the movement to reduce U.S. reliance on coal-fired power plants. In November 2009, PSR released Coal's Assault on Human Health, a comprehensive report that reviewed and summarized the latest peer-reviewed medical literature on coal pollution, providing a full picture of how coal affects human health from mining through combustion to the disposal of post-combustion waste. The report examined the cumulative harm to respiratory, cardiovascular, and nervous systems caused by coal combustion pollutants, finding that pollutants from coal contribute to four of the five leading causes of death in the United States.

In 2008, concerned about efforts to promote nuclear energy as a solution to environmental problems, PSR launched a safe energy program aimed at stopping the construction of new nuclear power plants and highlighting concerns about the costs of and dangers associated with nuclear energy.

=== Local and student chapters ===
PSR state and local chapters work on a range of issues, including hospital sustainability ("greening" of hospitals), sustainable agriculture, healthcare reform, and domestic violence prevention. Several PSR chapters are active in the gun control movement, working to ban handguns in the United States.

Student Physicians for Social Responsibility (SPSR) mobilizes medical students to engage with nuclear proliferation, environmental degradation, and social justice issues. As of 2019, SPSR operated a network of 39 chapters representing 650 students, orienting each new generation of medical students to create positive change through medical activism.

== Contemporary recognition and activities ==
PSR's work continues to receive recognition from academic and cultural institutions. In 2018, Harvard Medical School hosted a celebration titled "Art, Peace and Health" honoring the Nobel Peace Prizes received by IPPNW in 1985 and the International Campaign to Abolish Nuclear Weapons (ICAN) in 2017, with PSR playing a central role in both organizations. The event featured an exhibit of original poster art by Corita Kent presented to Greater Boston PSR in the 1980s in recognition of its work for a world without war.

In April 2025, Harvard Magazine reported on a museum exhibit at Harvard's Countway Library titled "Prescriptions for Peace," which explored PSR and IPPNW's historic anti-nuclear activism. The exhibit confirmed that "both PSR and IPPNW are still active in fighting the proliferation of nuclear weapons," with exhibit co-curator Dr. Katie Blanton noting that "in 2025, the anti-nuclear movement is as vital as ever."

== Leadership ==
=== Current leadership ===
As of 2025, PSR's leadership includes:

- Ankush Bansal (President) - A hospitalist physician in West Palm Beach, Florida, board certified in Internal Medicine, Preventive Medicine, and Lifestyle Medicine
- Brian Campbell, (Executive Director, November 2023-present)

=== Past presidents ===
Notable past presidents include:

- Bernard Lown (1961-1967, founding president)
- Helen Caldicott (1978-1984)
- Ira Helfand, (co-founder of revived PSR in 1978, later served as president) - Currently serves as co-president of IPPNW
- Michael J. Martin (2022-2023) - Currently serves as a board member
- Mark R. Vossler (immediate past president) - past president of the Washington state chapter

== Notable publications ==
PSR has produced numerous influential reports and publications throughout its history:

- "The Medical Consequences of Thermonuclear War" series, New England Journal of Medicine (1962)
- The Fallen Sky: Medical Consequences of Thermonuclear War (1963)
- Coal's Assault on Human Health (2009)
- Various reports on environmental health, including studies on reproductive health, child development, and aging

PSR members have also contributed extensively to public discourse on nuclear weapons and health policy through opinion pieces in major newspapers. Notable examples include a 2022 San Francisco Chronicle op-ed on nuclear weapons risks during the Ukraine war, and ongoing commentary on public health threats by PSR leadership in national publications.

== See also ==
- International Physicians for the Prevention of Nuclear War
- International Campaign to Abolish Nuclear Weapons
- Nuclear disarmament
- Anti-nuclear movement in the United States
- Bernard Lown
- Helen Caldicott
- Michael J. Martin
