= 1998 Australian waterfront dispute =

Event in Australian industrial relations history

April 1998 ABC news report on the Waterfront Dispute.

The Australian waterfront dispute of 1998 was an event in Australian industrial relations history, in which the Patrick Corporation undertook a restructuring of their operations for the purpose of dismissing their workforce. The restructuring by Patrick Corporation was later ruled illegal by Australian courts. The dispute involved Patrick Corporation terminating the employment of its workforce and locking out the workers of the workplace after the restructuring had taken place, with many of these workers members of the dominant Maritime Union of Australia. The resulting dismissal and locking out of their unionised workforce was supported by the Howard government.

Major events in the dispute occurred in four major ports, where the Patrick Corporation had significant operations: Melbourne, Brisbane, Fremantle and Sydney. It revolved around attempts by Patrick Corporation and the federal government to improve efficiency on Australia's wharves; primarily by reducing staffing numbers and the power of the Maritime Union of Australia.

== Waterfront productivity ==
Around 1995–96 approximately 70% of Australia's imports and 78% of exports were transported by sea, amounting to approximately $60 billion in trade. This, however, does not include the revenue on car importations.

Data was collected throughout 1997 by the Productivity Commission, comparing international container stevedoring performance for the same ships and trades. The data indicated that Australia charged generally higher, productivity was lower and services were less reliable than overseas. With the exception of bulk grain loading, other areas of traditional stevedoring also performed relatively poorly. It also found that marine service and port infrastructure charges were, in total, two to three times greater than at overseas ports – noting that only some of this reflects cost-recovery pricing in Australia.

Together with other problems in the transport chain, this under-performance was not only resulting in higher direct costs to shippers, but also significant indirect costs from delays and unreliability which could have been reduced. Overall, the international benchmarking revealed significant scope for improvement in Australia's performance.

== Industrial relations legislation ==
John Howard, before being elected in 1996, had promised significant industrial relations reform. In January 1997, the Howard Government substantially amended the Industrial Relations Act 1988, and renamed it the Workplace Relations Act 1996. The stated aim of this legislation was to foster individual choice in workplace bargaining by reducing the powers of external organisations, particularly trade unions, to intervene. In addition, the legislation reduced powers of the Australian Industrial Relations Commission to arbitrate disputes. The Act also introduced individual statutory employment contracts. These were known as Australian Workplace Agreements or AWAs. The watering down of collective bargaining provisions was a source of objection from many workers and unions.

== Beginnings of the dispute ==
Australian waterfront productivity had been an issue of concern since the 1980s. Patrick Corporation sought to improve productivity by creating redundancies and reducing overtime entitlements for its permanent employees, as well as hiring more employees on a casual basis. The Maritime Union of Australia (MUA) was formed through the amalgamation of two unions: the Seafarers Union of Australia (SUA), and the Waterside Workers Federation (WWF). The MUA was born from this background and retained a heavy union presence on the waterside.

At the time, it was mandatory for prospective employees to be card-carrying members of the MUA. The Howard Government sought to encourage a non-union workforce to compete against the MUA and made new legislative changes to bring this about.

After the legislative introduction of Australian Workplace Agreements, a number of stevedoring operators toyed with bringing individual contract workers into their workforces but abandoned their plans in the face of strident union opposition and activism.

== The Dubai operation ==
One Australian stevedoring company, Fynwest Pty Ltd, sought to recruit former and current Australian Defence Force members to counter the MUA. In particular, from December 1997, Fynwest began a campaign to recruit former and current members of the Special Air Service (SAS), paratroopers from 3RAR, commandos from 4RAR and other military specialists, to become stevedores. Others were recruited from controversial private military and security consulting companies, such as Sandline International and the Control Risks Group. This led to the use of terms like 'industrial mercenaries' in political and media circles.

Fynwest planned to send these recruits to Dubai in the United Arab Emirates, where international standard training could be provided. The newly trained stevedores would then take part in an Australian non-union dock workers training program.

The MUA was "tipped off" about the planned Fynwest operation and took the matter to the media who met the departing Fynwest employees as they boarded a flight to Dubai and questioned their "tourist" status. Intense criticism and the threat of international industrial retaliation forced the Dubai government to cancel visas for the Fynwest company employees.

== The lock-out ==
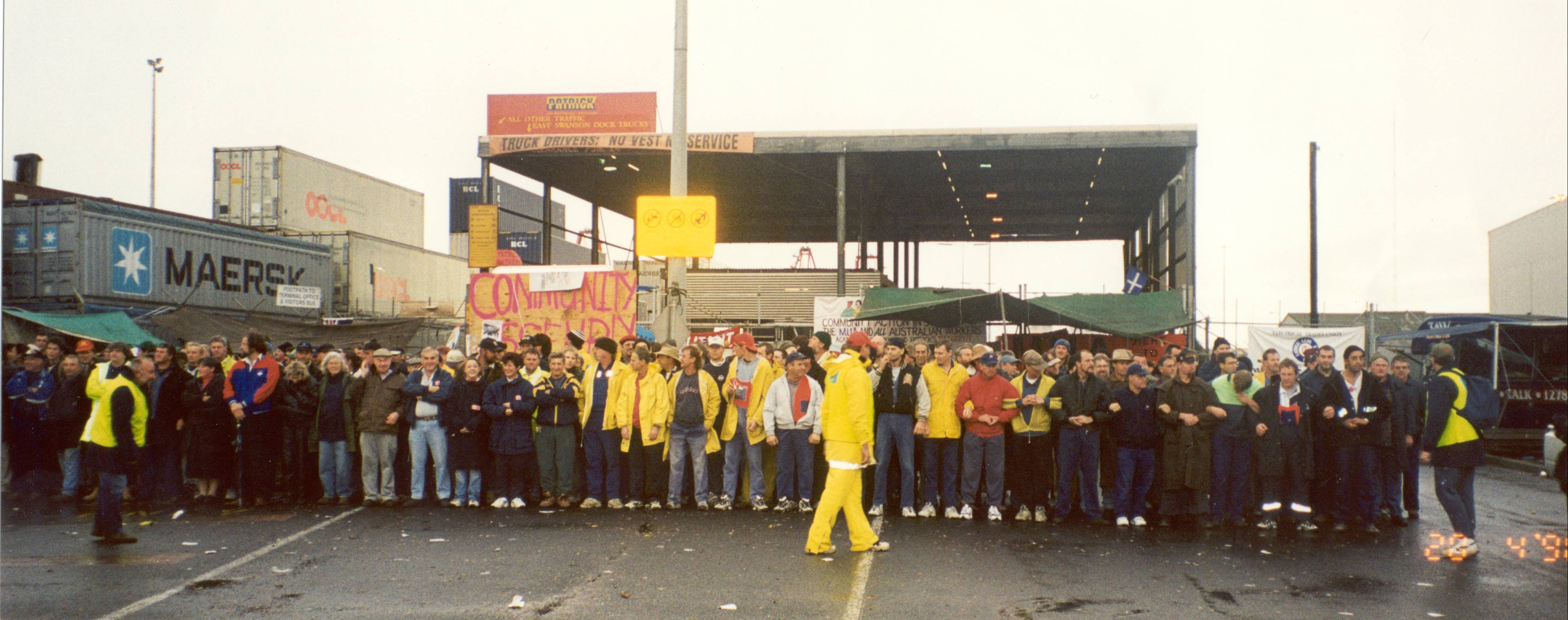
Picket line at Swanson Dock, Melbourne

In September 1997, Patrick implemented a restructure whereby the functions of employing its unionised workforce and owning its stevedoring business were divided into different companies. The stevedoring businesses and assets previously held by the employer entities were transferred to other companies within the Patricks Group. In addition, the employer entities entered into various labour supply agreements with the owner entities to supply Patricks with labour. As a consequence, the labour supply agreements became the major asset of the employer entities.

Significantly, the labour supply agreements were terminable by the owner entities without notice in circumstances of industrial action. The details of the corporate restructure were not made known to Patrick's employees or the MUA.

In late 1997 and early 1998, Patrick's employees engaged in industrial action, most notably at Melbourne's No 5 Webb Dock.

On 8 April 1998, Patrick's management dismissed all of its employees; liquidated its assets, becoming technically insolvent; and imposed a lockout at most ports in which it operated.

Minister for Workplace Relations, Peter Reith read from a prepared brief, stating that the government fully supported Patrick in their action.

By the following morning the docks were fully operational with new non-union staff in place.

Industrial action and pickets continued at Patrick's Docks around the country. A Supreme Court Injunction was obtained by Patrick's, effectively barring anyone from picketing the Webb Dock on 21 April, which unions threatened to defy.

== Litigation ==
The case went before the Federal Court with Justice North finding in favour of the union. He found that the company had deliberately restructured their corporate structure with the sole intent to dismiss their unionised workers.

The company with the support of the government appealed this decision to the full bench of the Federal Court which upheld Justice North's earlier decision. The company appealed to the High Court of Australia with the government's support. The High Court upheld the substance of the orders, but modified them to acknowledge the legitimate role of the (now insolvent) company's administrators.

== Resolution ==
The MUA and Patrick negotiated a new work agreement, which was adopted by the company and workers in June 1998. The agreement specified a near-halving of the permanent workforce through voluntary redundancies, the casualisation and contracting out of some jobs, smaller work crews, longer regular hours, company control over rostering, and productivity bonuses for faster loading. The union retained the ability to represent maritime workers, and the company achieved significant changes to work practices. While workplace Relations Minister Peter Reith stated at the time "There appears to be a number of reforms which will satisfy the seven benchmark objectives which are very important", ultimately the union won.

The original former military non-union workers had their contracts paid out by the employer (Fynwest/Patricks) at the conclusion of the dispute and received very generous payouts and bonuses in the order of $50,000 to $70,000 each.

== Popular culture ==
- The waterfront dispute was the subject of the 2007 miniseries Bastard Boys.
- It was the subject of Katherine Thomson's 2004 play 'Harbour'.
- It was also an influence on The Living End's song Roll On.
- It was also covered in the 1st episode of the ABC TV documentary The Howard Years, broadcast Monday 17 November 2008.
- It was briefly covered in episode 2 of 'Liberal Rule' which aired on 28 July 2009 on SBS.
- The dispute was covered in a six part ABC radio broadcast & podcast series ' Conspiracy? War on the waterfront' by Jan Fran published weekly from February to April 2025.

== See also ==
- 2012 Auckland waterfront dispute
