= Edwin Lyman =

American physicist

Edwin S. Lyman
- Education: New York University, Cornell University
- Awards: Leo Szilard Lectureship Award
- Scientific career
- Fields: Physics, Nuclear power and safety issues
- Workplaces: Union of Concerned Scientists, Nuclear Control Institute, Princeton University

External videos
- “Edwin Lyman”, Union of Concerned Scientists
- Debating nuclear risks with Ed Lyman, The Rational View, April 24, 2021
- Edwin Lyman on Nuclear Power Safety, C-SPAN/Washington Journal, March 31, 2019
- UCS Senior Scientist Edwin Lyman explains the nuclear crisis in Japan, Rachel Maddow show, March 11, 2011 -- Lyman starts around 6 minutes.

Edwin S. Lyman is a physicist and the Director of Nuclear Power Safety with the Union of Concerned Scientists (UCS). He specializes in nuclear proliferation, nuclear terrorism, and nuclear power safety.

Lyman has published extensively in journals and magazines, testified before Congress and advised other government groups, and been cited in many news stories. He acted as an expert analyst for damage to the Fukushima Daiichi nuclear power plant after the 2011 Tōhoku earthquake and tsunami and co-authored Fukushima: The Story of a Nuclear Disaster (New Press, 2014).

== Education ==
Lyman earned his A.B. in physics at New York University in 1986. At Cornell University he received his M.Sc. in 1990 and his Ph.D. in physics in 1992. He focused on string theory and high energy physics, preferring research with few military applications.

== Career ==
From 1992 to 1995, Lyman did postdoctoral research on science and security policy at Princeton University in the Center for Energy and Environmental Studies (later the Science and Global Security Program). One of the questions he considered was how to deal with post-Cold War plutonium. He and his colleagues sought ways to turn it into a stable waste form for disposal.

From 1995 to 2003, Lyman worked for the Nuclear Control Institute, where he promoted conversion of reactors from highly enriched to low-enriched uranium, which is not directly weapon-usable. He also advised on the protection of nuclear sites from terrorist attacks. He became president of the Institute in 2001.

In 2003, Lyman joined the Union of Concerned Scientists (UCS) as a senior scientist later becoming the Director of Nuclear Power Safety.

Lyman publishes extensively in journals and magazines, and has advised Congress and other government groups on a variety of topics relating to nuclear power, nuclear weapons and safety. He has recommended that the U.S. Nuclear Regulatory Commission (NRC) implement safety and security upgrades to prevent the possibility of terrorist attacks. Given the events of September 11 he describes NRC delays in doing so an "ominous trend".

Following the 2011 Tōhoku earthquake and tsunami Lyman served as an expert analyst on damage to the Fukushima Daiichi nuclear power plant. He is a co-author with David Lochbaum and Susan Q. Stranahan of Fukushima: The Story of a Nuclear Disaster (New Press, 2014).

Lyman is a member of the Institute of Nuclear Materials Management and the American Nuclear Society.

== Awards ==
In 2018, Lyman was awarded the 2018 Leo Szilard Lectureship Award from the American Physical Society "for using his technical expertise and tireless advocacy to maintain and strengthen U.S. policy on nuclear nonproliferation and reactor safety and security."

== See also ==
- Nuclear accidents in the United States
- Nuclear safety in the United States
- David Lochbaum
- Frank N. von Hippel
- M.V. Ramana
- Mark Cooper
