= WASH-740 =

WASH-740 was a report published by the U.S. Atomic Energy Commission (USAEC) in 1957. This report, called "Theoretical Possibilities and Consequences of Major Accidents in Large Nuclear Power Plants" (also known as "The Brookhaven Report"), estimated maximum possible damage from a meltdown with no containment building at a large nuclear reactor.

The conclusions of this study estimated the possible effects of a "maximum credible accident" for nuclear reactors then envisioned as being 3400 deaths, 43,000 injuries and property damage of $7 billion ($57bn adjusted for inflation in 2012 since 1957). The estimate of probability was one in a hundred thousand to one in a billion per reactor-year. When WASH-740 was revised in 1964-65 to account for the larger reactors then being designed, the new figures indicated that there could be as many as 45,000 deaths, 100,000 injuries, and $17 billion in property damage ($125bn adjusted for inflation since 1964).

However, the assumptions underlying the results were unrealistic (including the worst meteorological conditions, no containment building, and that half the reactor core is released into the atmosphere as micrometre-sized pellets without any examination of how this might occur). These were due to conservatism (estimating the maximum possible damage) and the need to use atomic bomb fallout data, which had been collected from tests (computers in 1955 being greatly insufficient to do the calculations).

As knowledge, models and computers improved the conclusions of this report were replaced by those of first WASH-1400 (1975, The Rasmussen Report), then CRAC-II (1982), and most recently NUREG-1150 (1991). Now all of these studies are considered obsolete (see the disclaimer to NUREG-1150), and are being replaced by the State-of-the-Art Reactor Consequence Analyses (SOARCA) study.

== See also ==
- Nuclear safety in the U.S.
- Nuclear power
- Nuclear power plant
- Nuclear accidents in the United States
- WASH-1400
