= WASH-1400 =

1975 report for the Nuclear Regulatory Commission

WASH-1400, 'The Reactor Safety Study (later known as NUREG-75/014) was a report produced in 1975 for the Nuclear Regulatory Commission by a committee of specialists under Professor Norman Rasmussen. It "generated a storm of criticism in the years following its release". In the years immediately after its release, WASH-1400 was followed by a number of reports that either peer reviewed its methodology or offered their own judgments about probabilities and consequences of various events at commercial reactors. In at least a few instances, some offered critiques of the study's assumptions, methodology, calculations, peer review procedures, and objectivity. A succession of reports, including NUREG-1150, the State-of-the-Art Reactor Consequence Analyses and others, have carried-on the tradition of PRA and its application to commercial power plants.

== Content ==
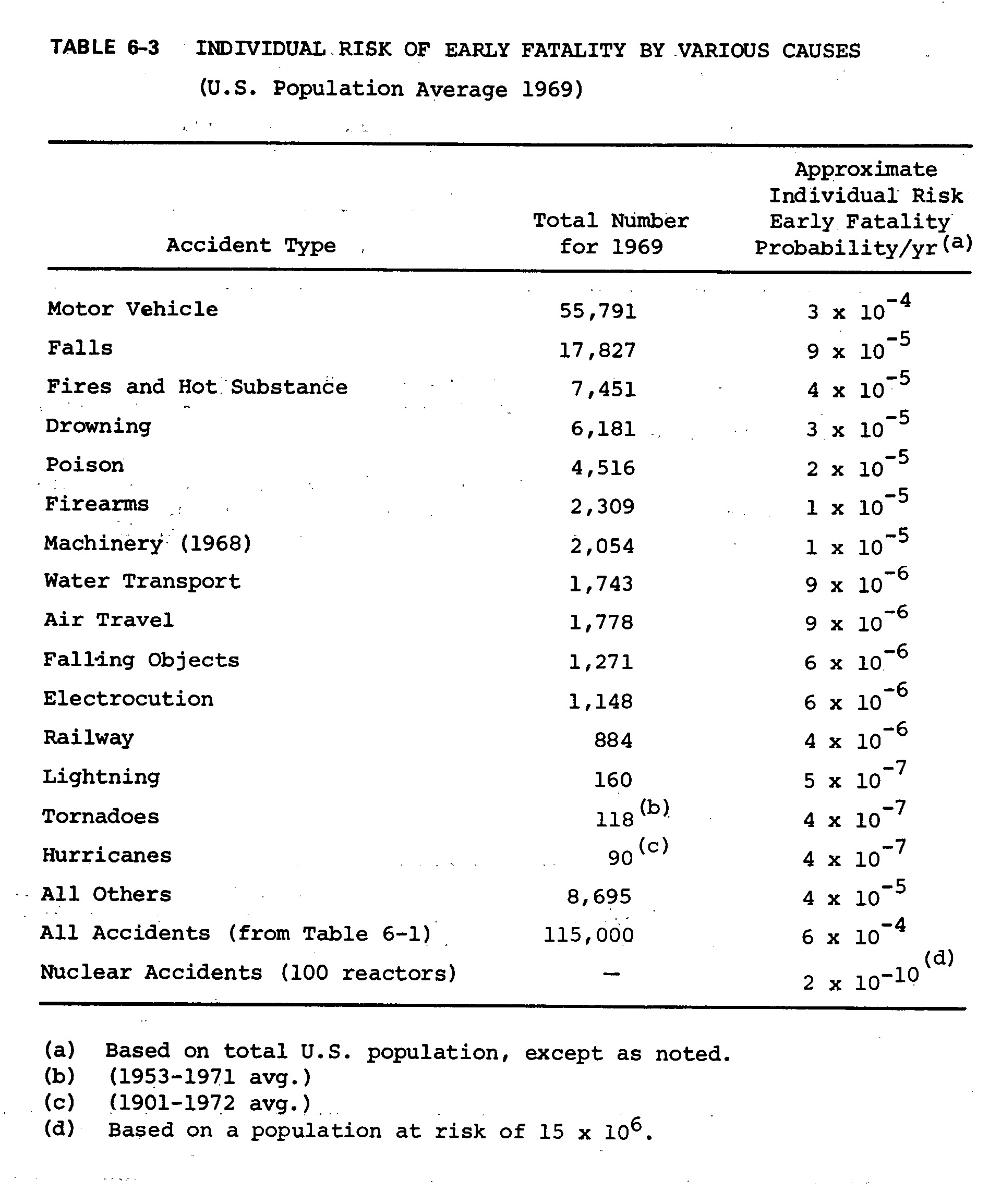
Individual Risk of Early Fatality by Various Causes, Table 6-3, WASH-1400 pg. 112

WASH-1400 considered the course of events that might arise during a serious accident at a (then) large modern Light water reactor. It estimated the radiological consequences of these events, and the probability of their occurrence, using a fault tree/event tree approach. This technique is called Probabilistic Risk Assessment (PRA). The report concluded that the risks to the individual posed by nuclear power stations were acceptably small, compared with other tolerable risks. Specifically, the report concluded, using the methods and resources and knowledge available at the time, that the probability of a complete core meltdown is about 1 in 20,000 per reactor per year.

According to Table 6-3 on pg. 112 of WASH-1400, individual persons have a less than 1 in 5,000,000,000 (Tbl 6-3, pg. 112) chance of dying on a yearly basis from the operation of 100 nuclear power plants in the United States. This is less than yearly risk of being struck by lightning and being killed (1 in 20,000,000, Tbl 6-3, pg. 112), being in a fatal auto collision (1 in 3,000 chance of dying, Tbl 6-3, pg. 112), or any other accident risk mentioned in WASH-1400.

== Criticism and debate ==
In the years since its publication, WASH-1400 has occasioned much discussion of its methods and has seen the rise of competing judgments about the probabilities and consequences of adverse events in commercial nuclear power reactors. A panel of scientists organized by the American Physical Society (APS) "found much to criticize" in the WASH-1400 report. The panel noted that fatality estimates had considered only deaths during the first 24 hours after an accident, although other pathways (e.g., via radioactive cesium) could result in environmental exposures after the acute phase of an accident and could expose large populations to adverse effects, albeit at small doses. Any cancers that might arise might not show up until years after the accident. The APS reviewers also criticized the report’s methods for predicting the performance of emergency cooling systems.

One particular focus of discussion has been the size of the probabilities, posited in WASH-1400, of the occurrence of the various accidents and events. While a 1982 report by Science Applications Inc. (SAI) found those of WASH-1400 to be underestimates, a contemporaneous report by the Institute of Nuclear Power Operations found SAI's to be too high by a factor of 30.

The Union of Concerned Scientists released a 150-page report critiquing the WASH-1400 report, and in June 1976, the House Subcommittee on Energy and Environment held hearings on the validity of the report's findings. As a result of these hearings, NRC agreed to have a review group examine the validity of the report's conclusions.

In 1977, the study was peer-reviewed by the NRC Risk Assessment Review Group (known as the Lewis Committee after organizing chair Professor Harold Lewis of the University of California). In its September 1978 report, the group concluded that "the uncertainties in WASH-1400's estimates of the probabilities of severe accidents were in general, greatly understated". Rassmussen observed that the likelihood of a core melt, as estimated in WASH-1400 and NUREG 1150, were in close agreement and their uncertainty bands overlapped.

In January 1979, the NRC issued a policy statement in which it accepted numerous criticisms of WASH-1400 raised by the Lewis Report, and it withdrew any endorsement of the executive summary.

== Legacy ==
In March 1979, the Three Mile Island accident vindicated WASH-1400's approach and some of its probabilistic estimates. The report had said that loss of coolant was more likely from a small break than a large break (which is what happened at Three Mile Island), and that the probability of a non-ideal human response needed to be taken into account (which is what turned the coolant loss into a partial meltdown).

Work continued on PRA including NUREG-1150 and an ongoing study being performed by the Nuclear Regulatory Commission called the State-of-the-Art Reactor Consequence Analyses (SOARCA). Specific Studies were also made of two plants at Zion and Indian Point—the so-called Z/IP Study.

The NRC reversed its policy, and the PRA methodology became generally followed as part of the safety-assessment of all modern nuclear power plants. In the 1990s, all U.S. nuclear power plants submitted PRAs to the NRC under the Individual Plant Examination program , and five of these were the basis for the 1991 NUREG-1150.

The report correctly foresaw the impact a tsunami could have on a nuclear power station. It concluded that "Some plants are located on the sea shore where the possibility of tsunami, and waves and high water levels due to hurricanes exist. The plant design in these cases must accommodate the largest waves and water levels that can be expected. Such events were assessed to represent negligible risks."

== See also ==
- CRAC-II (1982)
- Nuclear power
- Nuclear reactor accidents in the United States
- Nuclear safety in the United States
- NUREG-1150 (1991)
- State-of-the-Art Reactor Consequence Analyses (2012)
- WASH-740 (1957)
