= CRAC-II =

CRAC-II is both a computer code (titled Calculation of Reactor Accident Consequences) and the 1982 report of the simulation results performed by Sandia National Laboratories for the Nuclear Regulatory Commission. The report is sometimes referred to as the CRAC-II report because it is the computer program used in the calculations, but the report is also known as the 1982 Sandia Siting Study or as NUREG/CR-2239. The computer program MACCS2 has since replaced CRAC-II for the consequences of radioactive release.

CRAC-II has been declared to be obsolete and will be replaced by the State-of-the-Art Reactor Consequence Analyses study.

The CRAC-II simulations calculated the possible consequences of a worst-case accident under worst-case conditions (a so-called "class-9 accident") for several different U.S. nuclear power plants. In the Sandia Siting Study, the Indian Point Energy Center was calculated to have the largest possible consequences for an SST1 (spectrum of source terms) release, with estimated maximum possible casualty numbers of around 50,000 deaths, 150,000 injuries, and property damage of $274 Billion to $314 Billion (based on figures at the time of the report in 1982). The Sandia Siting Study, however, is commonly misused as a risk analysis, which it is not. It is a sensitivity analysis of different amounts of radioactive releases and an SST1 release is now generally considered not a credible accident (see below).

Another significant report is the 1991 NUREG-1150 calculations, which is a more-rigorous risk assessment of five U.S. Nuclear Power Plants.

== Followup study ==
As the NRC was preparing NUREG-1437, Supplement 56, "Generic Environmental Impact Statement for License Renewal of Nuclear Plants Supplement 56 Regarding Fermi Nuclear Power Plant", it solicited comments on the proposed report. In response to comments specifically mentioning the CRAC-II study, the NRC wrote:

"The U.S. Nuclear Regulatory Commission has devoted considerable research resources, both in the past and currently, to evaluating accidents and the possible public consequences of severe reactor accidents. The NRC's most recent studies have confirmed that early research into the topic led to extremely conservative consequence analyses that generate invalid results for attempting to quantify the possible effects of very unlikely severe accidents. In particular, these previous studies did not reflect current plant design, operation, accident management strategies or security enhancements. They often used unnecessarily conservative estimates or assumptions concerning possible damage to the reactor core, the possible radioactive contamination that could be released, and possible failures of the reactor vessel and containment buildings. These previous studies also failed to realistically model the effect of emergency preparedness. The NRC performed a state-of-the-art assessment of possible severe accidents as part of its ongoing effort to evaluate the consequences of such accidents."

This study was published as "NUREG–1935, State-of-the-Art Reactor Consequence Analyses Report" in 2012.

== See also ==
- Nuclear accidents in the United States
- Nuclear safety in the U.S.
- Nuclear power
- RELAP5-3D
- WASH-740 (1957)
- WASH-1400 (1975)
- NUREG-1150 (1991)
