= Lochbaum =

Lochbaum is a surname. Notable people with the surname include:

- David Lochbaum (fl. 1978), American nuclear engineer
- Kelly Lochbaum (born 1973), Canadian football player
