= State-of-the-Art Reactor Consequence Analyses =

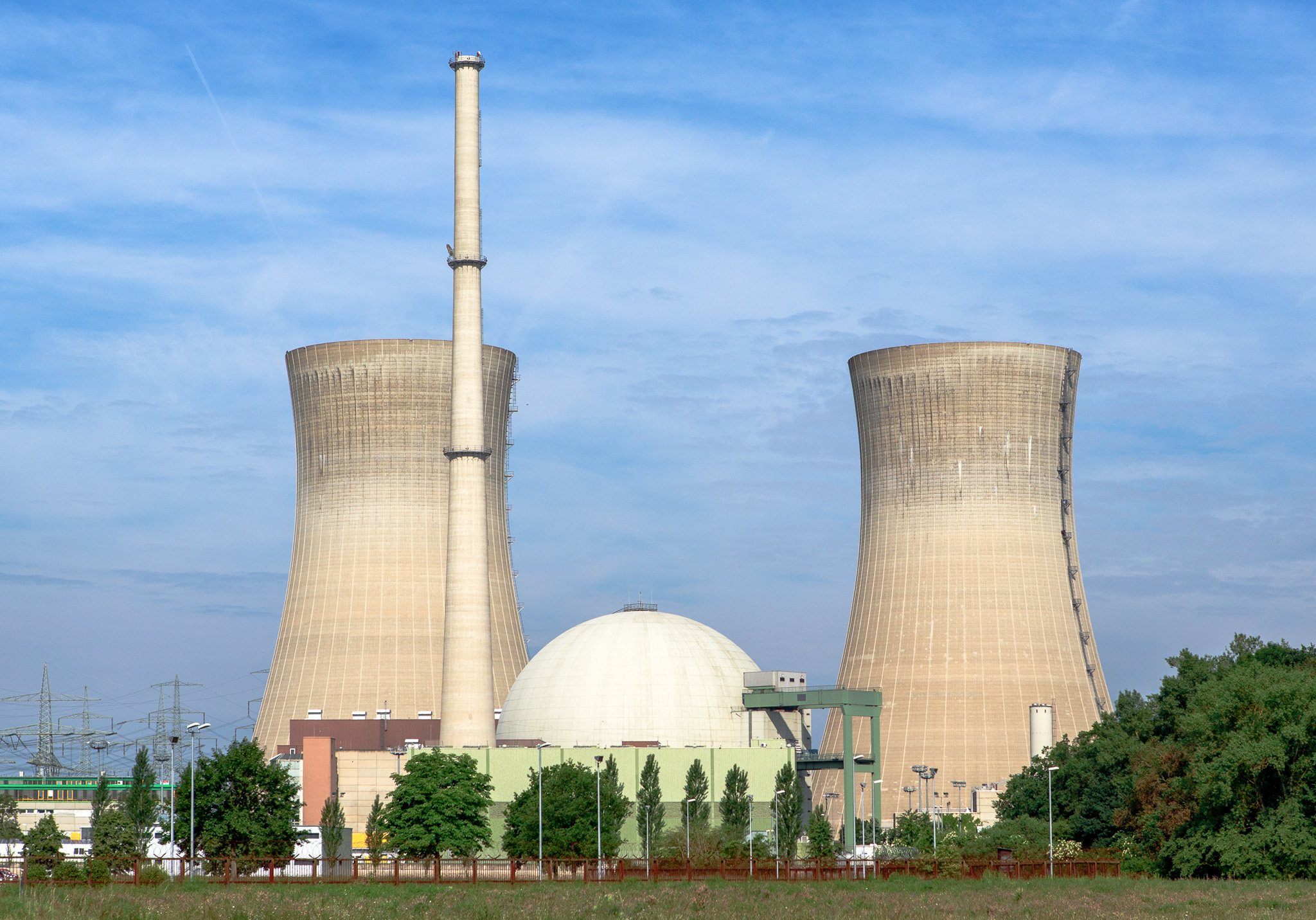
Grafenrheinfeld Nuclear Power Plant

The State-of-the-Art Reactor Consequence Analyses (SOARCA) is a study of nuclear power plant safety conducted by the Nuclear Regulatory Commission. The purpose of the SOARCA is assessment of possible impact on population caused by major radiation accidents that might occur at NPPs. This new study updates older studies with the latest state-of-the-art computer models and incorporates new plant safety and security enhancements.

== History ==
=== Older studies ===
- WASH-740 (1957)
- WASH-1400 (1975)
- CRAC-II (1982)
- NUREG-1150 (1991)

== See also ==
- Incident response team
- Nuclear power
- Nuclear power debate
- Nuclear safety in the U.S.
- Nuclear safety systems
- Nuclear fuel response to reactor accidents
- Nuclear accidents in the United States
