= Susan Q. Stranahan =

American journalist

- Employer: Philadelphia Inquirer
- Writing career
- Education: College of Wooster, 1968
- Subject: Journalism
- Notable awards: 1980 Pulitzer Prize

C-SPAN, April 15, 2014
- "After Words"

Susan Q. Stranahan is an American journalist and co-author of several books, who writes primarily about energy and the environment. Stranahan was a staff writer for The Philadelphia Inquirer from 1972 to 2000 and served on the newspaper's editorial board. She was one of the recipients of the 1980 Pulitzer Prize for journalism as lead reporter for a Philadelphia Inquirer team that covered the Three Mile Island accident. She has taught environmental writing at the University of Pennsylvania.

In addition to The Philadelphia Inquirer, Stranahan has been published in media including The New York Times, The Washington Post, Smithsonian, Mother Jones. Columbia Journalism Review, Los Angeles Times, Fortune, Time, and Rolling Stone.

She has written or co-authored several books. Her first book, Susquehanna, River of Dreams (1993), is described as a classic in environmental history.

Beyond the Flames (2000, with Larry King) documents the subsequent lives of fire fighters, policemen and paramedics who were exposed to toxic fumes while fighting a fire at an illegal chemical dump in Chester, Pennsylvania on February 2, 1978.

With David Lochbaum and Edwin Lyman she co-wrote Fukushima: The Story of a Nuclear Disaster (New Press, 2014). Stranahan is credited with the book's "lucid and gripping narrative".

Susan Q. Stranahan is a daughter of Common Pleas Court President Judge John Q. Stranahan and his wife Carol Scott Stranahan. She attended the College of Wooster, graduating in 1968, and received the Distinguished Alumni Award from the college in 1996. Stranahan currently resides in Chebeague Island, Maine.
