= Schlissel =

Schlissel is a surname. Notable people with the surname include:

- Dan Schlissel (born 1970), American record producer and record-label founder (Stand Up! Records, -ismist Recordings)
- David A. Schlissel, American energy consultant
- Lillian Schlissel (born 1930), American historian, professor and author
- Mark Schlissel (born 1957), American academic
- Yishai Schlissel (born 1975), Israeli homophobic criminal
