= NUREG-1150 =

NUREG-1150 "Severe Accident Risks: An Assessment for Five U.S. Nuclear Power Plants", published December 1990 by the Nuclear Regulatory Commission (NRC) is a follow-up to the WASH-1400 and CRAC-II safety studies that employs the methodology of plant-specific Probabilistic Risk Assessment (PRA). The research team, led by Denwood Ross, Joseph Murphy, and Mark Cunningham, concluded that the current generation of nuclear power plants exceeded NRC safety goals.

"This study was a significant turning point in the use of risk-based concepts in the regulatory process and enabled the NRC to greatly improve its methods for assessing containment performance after core damage and accident progression." However significant, and sometimes unrealistic, conservatisms were applied in this study and it is (as of 2006) being replaced with a new state-of-the-art study entitled State-of-the-Art Reactor Consequence Analyses(see below).

== Results ==
Results of NUREG-1150 (page 12-3):

- Average probability of an individual early fatality per reactor per year:

- NRC Safety Goal: 5 × 10^{−7}
- Typical pressurized water reactor (PWR): 2 × 10^{−8}
- Typical boiling water reactor (BWR): 5 × 10^{−11}

- Average probability of an individual latent cancer death per reactor per year:

- NRC Safety Goal: 2 × 10^{−6}
- Typical PWR: 2 × 10^{−9}
- Typical BWR: 4 × 10^{−10}

Using the data on pages 3–5, 3-7, 4-5 and 4-7 the probability of some U.S. plant having core damage is about 30% over 20 years - this number doesn't include containment failure, which is conservatively estimated at 8% for PWRs (page 3-13, weighting by the probabilities at the bottom) and 84% for BWRs (page 4-14, same technique). Assuming that the 104 current-design (2005) U.S. plants are similar to the two "typical" plants, the chance of a major release of radiation is under 8% every 20 years.

The typical BWR was the Peach Bottom plant and the typical PWR was the Surry plant.

Parts of NUREG-1150 were compiled by Sandia National Laboratories, which continues to do such research.

NUREG-1420 contains the Kouts' Committee peer review of NUREG-1150.

== NRC disclaimer of CRAC-II and NUREG-1150 ==
The NRC, which initially conducted the NUREG-1150 study, has issued the following statement:

The U.S. Nuclear Regulatory Commission has devoted considerable research resources, both in the past and currently, to evaluating accidents and the possible public consequences of severe reactor accidents. The NRC's most recent studies have confirmed that early research into the topic led to extremely conservative consequence analyses that generate invalid results for attempting to quantify the possible effects of very unlikely severe accidents. According to the NRC, these previous studies did not reflect current plant design, operation, accident management strategies or security enhancements. They often used unnecessarily conservative estimates or assumptions concerning possible damage to the reactor core, the possible radioactive contamination that could be released, and possible failures of the reactor vessel and containment buildings. These previous studies also failed to realistically model the effect of emergency preparedness. The NRC staff is currently pursuing a new, state-of-the-art assessment of possible severe accidents and their consequences.

== See also ==
- Nuclear accidents in the United States
- Nuclear safety in the U.S.
- Nuclear power
- Nuclear fuel response to reactor accidents
