= North Anna Nuclear Generating Station =

Nuclear power plant in Louisa County, Virginia

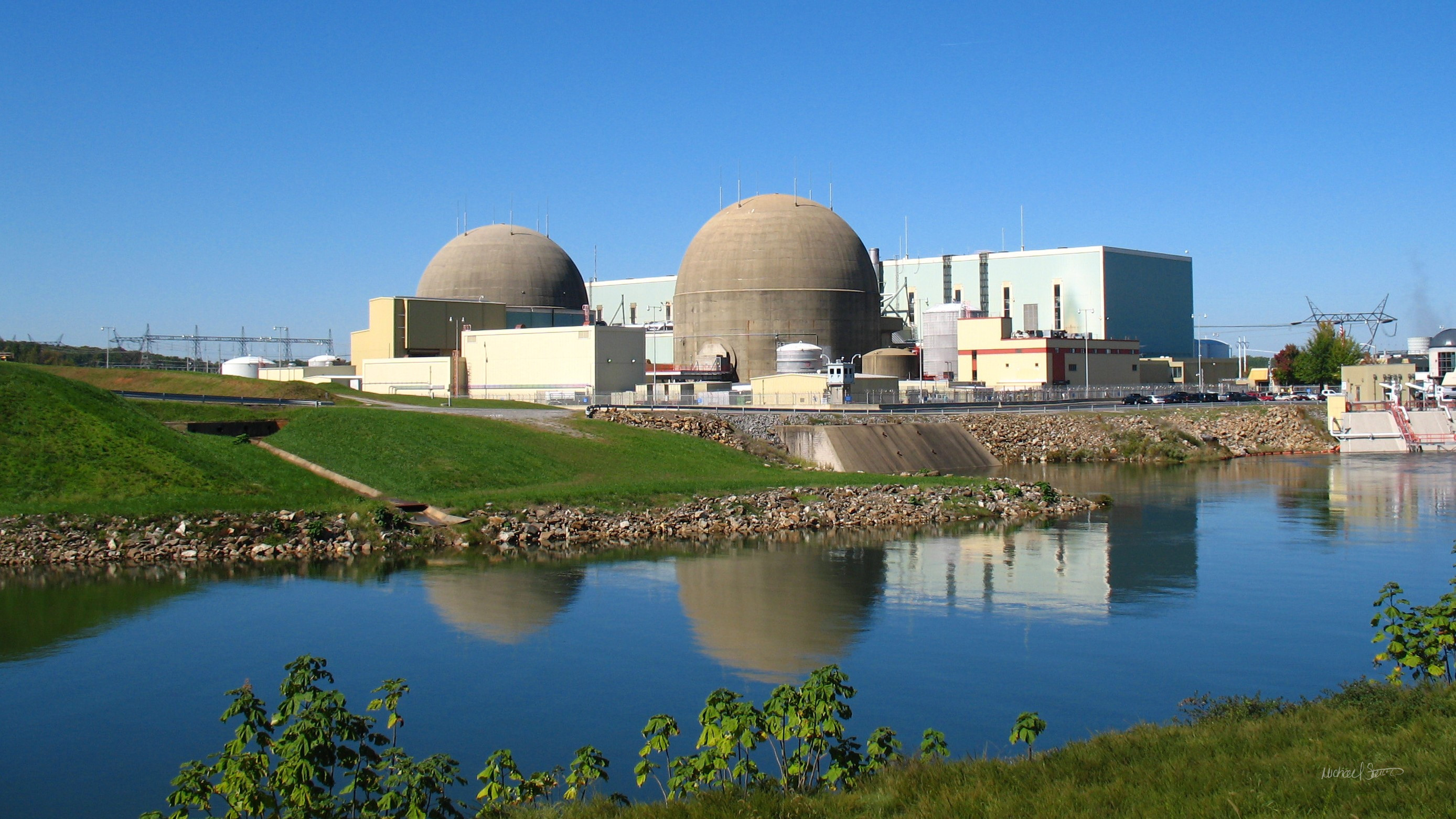
- North Anna Nuclear Power Plant
- Official name: North Anna Power Station
- Country: United States
- Location: Louisa County, near Mineral, Virginia
- Coordinates: 38°3′38″N 77°47′22″W
- Status: Operational
- Construction began: February 19, 1971
- Commission date: Unit 1: June 6, 1978; Unit 2: December 14, 1980
- Construction cost: $3.861 billion (2007 USD)
- Owners: Dominion Virginia Power (88.4%), Old Dominion Electric Cooperative (11.6%)
- Operator: Dominion Energy

Nuclear power station
- Reactor type: PWR
- Reactor supplier: Westinghouse
- Cooling source: Lake Anna, North Anna River
- Thermal capacity: 2 × 2940 MW_{th}

Power generation
- Units operational: 1 × 948 MW; 1 × 944 MW
- Make and model: WH 3-loop (DRYSUB)
- Units planned: 1 × 1535 MW ESBWR
- Units cancelled: 2 × 907 MW B&W 145
- Nameplate capacity: 1892 MW (current); 3427 MW (planned)
- Capacity factor: 97.30% (2017); 83.50% (lifetime)
- Annual net output: 15,371 GWh (2021)

External links
- Website: North Anna Power Station
- Commons: Related media on Commons

The North Anna Nuclear Generating Station is a nuclear power plant on a 1,075-acre (435 ha) site in Louisa County, Virginia, in the Mid-Atlantic United States. The site is operated by Dominion Generation company and is jointly owned by the Dominion Virginia Power corporation (88.4%) and by the Old Dominion Electric Cooperative (11.6%).

The plant has two Westinghouse pressurized water reactors which went on-line in 1978 and 1980, respectively. Together the reactors generate 1.79 gigawatts of power, which is distributed mainly to the greater Richmond area and to Northern Virginia. In March 2003, the Nuclear Regulatory Commission approved 20 year license extensions for both Units 1 & 2. Subsequent license applications for both units were submitted in 2020. The Nuclear Regulatory Commission approved the license for both Units 1 & 2 in August 2024. Unit 1's license will expire on April 1, 2058 and Unit 2's license will expire on August 21, 2060.

An artificial lake, Lake Anna, was constructed on the North Anna River to provide a reservoir of water coolant for use with the nuclear plant.

Dominion Energy currently owns nuclear power plants in Virginia (North Anna, Surry), Connecticut (Millstone), South Carolina (Virgil C. Summer Nuclear Generating Station), and Wisconsin (Kewaunee). North Anna is similar in design and appearance to Surry Power Station.

== Unit 3 ==
Dominion obtained regulatory permission from the NRC to build and operate an additional unit at the site in 2017. The additional unit 3 would be an ESBWR. but the project was placed on hold later in 2017 before construction started.

=== Timeline ===
Dominion Nuclear North Anna, LLC submitted its application for an Early Site Permit (ESP) for the North Anna site on September 25, 2003. The NRC issued the ESP on November 27, 2007. On the same day, Dominion submitted an application for a Combined Construction and Operating License (COL) for a 1,520 MWe GE–Hitachi Economic Simplified Boiling Water Reactor (ESBWR), designated as North Anna Unit 3.

In 2009, having failed to agree on terms for an engineering construction and procurement deal with GE-Hitachi to actually build the reactor, Dominion issued a new request for proposals from reactor vendors. In 2010, Dominion announced that it had selected a 1,700 MWe, US-specific version of Mitsubishi Heavy Industries' (MHI) Advanced Pressurized Water Reactor (APWR) for the potential Unit 3. The proposed reactor brought public protest. On August 7, 2008 six activists from the Peoples Alliance for Clean Energy were arrested at the North Anna Information Center for trespassing.

On October 29, 2010, Dominion president Tom Farrell told investors that Dominion had decided to slow its development of the proposed third reactor and wait until the combined construction permit-operating license (COL) was approved by the NRC before deciding to complete the project. This approval was expected in early 2013 but issued in May 2017.

In 2013, it was announced that the ESBWR design would be pursued after all. Dominion stated that it would amend its COL application to reflect the ESBWR technology by the end of 2013 and expected to receive the COL "no earlier than late 2015." Dominion noted that it had not yet committed to building a new unit at North Anna. In October 2015, the Virginia Attorney-General's Office called for the abandonment of the project because of the cost burden on consumers.

On January 19, 2017, the Nuclear Regulatory Commission announced that its staff had completed its Final Safety Evaluation Report for a Combined License for the proposed reactor. The report concluded there are no safety aspects that would preclude issuing the license for the construction and operation of the new reactor. On May 31, 2017, the Nuclear Regulatory Commission announced that it had authorized the issuance of a Combined License for North Anna. The license granted permission to build and operate an ESBWR design at the site. The license contained conditions, including specific actions associated with the NRC's post-Fukushima requirements for Mitigation Strategies and Spent Fuel Pool Instrumentation, and a pre-startup schedule for post-Fukushima aspects of the new reactor's emergency preparedness plans and procedures.

On September 6, 2017, Dominion Energy paused development activities related to North Anna Unit 3, a decision that nuclear consultant Jim Little suggests may have been due to market conditions and competition from natural gas. Since the federal construction and operating license is valid for 20 years, Dominion Energy may opt to resume the project if economic prospects for the plant improve within that period.

== Small modular reactor ==
In July 2024 Dominion Energy Virginia announced it was working with companies to evaluate siting a small modular reactor at North Anna. A state law recently passed enables this if additional costs for a typical customer are capped at $1.40/month.

== Electricity production ==
Generation (MWh) of North Anna Nuclear Generating Station (Nuclear Only)
Year	Jan	Feb	Mar	Apr	May	Jun	Jul	Aug	Sep	Oct	Nov	Dec	Annual (Total)
2001	1,330,009	1,143,905	854,828	1,098,088	1,345,816	1,328,286	1,309,556	1,180,135	766,649	1,055,363	675,270	1,008,849	13,096,754
2002	1,383,132	1,249,604	1,384,480	1,336,170	1,380,245	1,329,531	1,369,319	1,368,377	808,459	695,411	673,544	695,764	13,674,036
2003	657,460	934,583	670,491	873,437	1,378,282	1,104,919	1,370,835	1,368,968	1,326,010	1,381,122	1,337,023	1,380,994	13,784,124
2004	1,380,177	1,131,538	1,380,310	1,334,625	727,566	1,293,289	1,367,708	1,368,121	898,538	1,217,670	1,327,409	1,379,475	14,806,426
2005	1,378,645	1,245,298	1,379,217	1,331,771	1,376,260	1,165,921	1,200,615	1,133,899	1,305,752	631,866	1,167,316	1,371,729	14,688,289
2006	1,344,734	1,092,662	911,693	1,100,505	1,370,085	1,320,414	1,358,625	1,355,840	1,322,511	1,372,339	1,174,088	1,369,662	15,093,158
2007	1,341,834	1,225,477	1,053,541	787,792	1,365,955	1,290,720	1,179,547	1,355,964	823,746	1,017,273	1,319,018	1,226,060	13,986,927
2008	1,317,166	1,103,932	1,359,104	1,316,687	1,357,892	1,304,130	1,342,611	1,345,696	934,784	672,744	1,015,466	1,363,213	14,433,425
2009	1,362,798	1,231,207	833,088	1,274,774	1,347,168	1,310,543	1,348,917	1,345,588	1,310,138	1,226,884	1,321,340	1,290,165	15,202,610
2010	1,361,687	1,228,192	1,114,682	684,015	1,300,022	1,175,597	1,268,099	1,387,299	881,803	297,310	1,279,603	1,421,153	13,399,462
2011	1,401,513	1,280,879	1,415,138	1,370,636	1,410,534	1,348,095	1,380,199	1,008,408	0	0	490,477	1,412,638	12,518,517
2012	1,395,731	1,329,787	947,914	702,155	1,388,489	1,382,980	1,408,348	1,412,854	1,382,074	1,118,973	1,408,250	1,455,635	15,333,190
2013	1,458,785	1,318,027	1,457,705	843,393	850,982	1,382,500	1,414,297	1,420,297	851,102	1,135,893	1,413,262	1,459,030	15,005,273
2014	1,460,436	1,268,792	1,454,550	1,407,430	1,440,364	1,376,034	1,412,657	1,415,903	824,315	1,179,169	1,411,551	1,237,451	15,888,652
2015	1,431,286	1,258,957	916,508	1,332,610	1,441,757	1,375,687	1,411,730	1,414,436	1,376,806	1,446,635	1,407,057	1,457,163	16,270,632
2016	1,457,529	1,343,315	826,669	1,154,890	1,448,729	1,382,711	1,378,686	1,320,413	906,041	1,037,329	1,410,888	1,454,177	15,121,377
2017	1,458,978	1,273,105	1,458,065	1,406,585	1,444,147	1,378,445	1,410,563	1,415,040	896,555	1,191,180	1,410,077	1,383,347	16,126,087
2018	1,492,806	1,305,000	949,016	1,021,510	1,440,242	1,374,305	1,367,700	1,406,239	1,371,276	1,439,156	1,410,097	1,455,184	16,032,531
2019	1,396,877	1,297,006	766,348	1,165,131	1,437,982	1,322,702	1,401,589	1,410,977	846,872	1,411,119	1,411,659	1,456,277	15,324,539
2020	1,453,603	1,352,452	1,434,579	1,185,333	1,407,033	1,360,027	1,401,053	1,404,239	938,911	997,839	1,408,174	1,456,660	15,799,903
2021	1,456,185	1,309,964	998,445	820,317	1,153,390	1,376,263	1,410,118	1,409,507	1,161,340	1,416,680	1,404,295	1,455,142	15,371,646
2022	1,458,191	1,316,681	838,610	1,073,791	1,428,108	1,362,768	1,406,451	995,230	704,180	820,347	1,407,495	1,459,044	14,270,896
2023	1,456,930	1,315,651	1,451,180	1,401,192	1,444,616	1,390,938	1,411,171	1,414,672	829,273	1,101,540	1,409,573	1,201,530	15,828,266
2024	1,448,958	1,350,300	762,406	1,199,340	1,381,012	1,365,925	1,407,458	1,413,847	1,385,158	1,442,234	1,408,499	1,458,647	16,023,784
2025	1,460,646	1,316,512	744,492	1,249,212	1,439,279	1,376,188	1,402,797	1,403,175	817,767	915,316	1,411,221	1,459,459	14,996,064
2026	1,457,954	1,318,021	1,452,731	1,398,331	1,435,347	1,376,559	1,399,530	1,382,303					--

== Surrounding population ==
The Nuclear Regulatory Commission (NRC) defines two emergency planning zones around nuclear power plants: a plume exposure pathway zone with a radius of 10 miles (16 km), concerned primarily with exposure to, and inhalation of, airborne radioactive contamination, and an ingestion pathway zone of about 50 miles (80 km), concerned primarily with ingestion of food and liquid contaminated by radioactivity.

The 2010 U.S. population within 10 miles (16 km) of North Anna was 21,396, an increase of 15.7 percent in a decade, according to an analysis of U.S. Census data for msnbc.com. The 2010 U.S. population within 50 miles (80 km) was 1,912,015, an increase of 22.6 percent since 2000. Cities within 50 miles (80 km) include Richmond (40 miles (64 km) to city center).

== Seismic risk ==
The Nuclear Regulatory Commission's estimate of the risk each year of an earthquake intense enough to cause core damage to the reactor at North Anna was 1 in 22,727, according to an NRC study published in August 2010.

According to the USGS, two distinct seismic zones are located in Virginia. The Central Virginia Seismic Zone and the Giles County Seismic Zone. Both of these zones produce recurrent small earthquakes at least every few years. The North Anna Nuclear Generating Station, located 40 miles northwest of Richmond, lies within the Central Virginia Seismic Zone.

=== Known fault ===
During the construction of original nuclear reactors at North Anna, the utility learned of a tectonic fault within the construction site of the proposed plants from its outside independent engineering firm, Stone & Webster, who the utility had hired to assess the proposed nuclear plant locations. The government fined the utility $32,000.00 for concealing this information.

According to the Huffington Post, this 1977 Justice Department memo "..focused on how the power company and federal regulatory officials went to efforts to not make public the knowledge of geologic faulting at North Anna. "[V]irtually the entire Office of Regulation of the [Nuclear Regulator Commission was]... well aware of the fault and determined not to take any immediate action," according to the memo. A government attorney, Bradford Whitman, did not recommend prosecution at the time, but the power company was eventually fined $32,500 for making false statements during the licensing process, according to the DOJ memo."

== Incidents ==
The Nuclear Regulatory Commission extended the operating licenses of these plants for an additional 20 years in 2003.

=== 2011 Virginia earthquake ===
At 1:51pm on August 23, 2011, a 5.8 magnitude earthquake occurred, centered south of Mineral, Virginia, eleven miles from the North Anna Nuclear Station. The Associated Press reported the quake "was felt as far north as Rhode Island, New York City and Martha's Vineyard, Mass." The reactors automatically shut down and, because of a loss of offsite power, four diesel generators started up to supply electricity to safety systems. The plant reported an "Alert" status, the second lowest level of four NRC emergency classifications, until 11:16am on August 24, 2011. One of the generators suffered a coolant leak and stopped working. A fifth standby generator was activated to replace the broken unit, which was repaired. Offsite power was restored later on August 23. Dominion also reported that the aftershocks did not affect the power plant. Also on August 24, Dominion announced that it had ended the "Notice of Unusual Event", the least serious of the NRC emergency classifications, at the North Anna Power Station following inspection of equipment susceptible to seismic activity. However the plant was not restarted, pending NRC permission, until November.

After the Fukushima disaster had occurred six months prior, the Virginia earthquake prompted public fears of a similar nuclear accident at North Anna.

After more than two months of inspections, NRC permitted restart in November 2011. As of December 20, 2011, both units at North Anna Power Station have restarted and are operating at full power.

=== 17 February 2012 ===
On-site groundwater was found to contain a high level of tritium. The source of the tritium leak was unknown.

=== 14 December 2016 ===
Some diesel generator fuel oil was believed to be released underground, the source of leakage was unknown.

== Reactor data ==
The North Anna Nuclear Generating Station consists of two operational reactors, two originally planned units were cancelled. One additional unit is planned.

Reactor unit	Reactor type	Capacity(MW)		Construction started	Electricity grid connection	Commercial operation	Shutdown
Reactor unit	Reactor type	Net	Gross	Construction started	Electricity grid connection	Commercial operation	Shutdown
North Anna-1	Westinghouse 3-loop	903 MW	973 MW	1971-02-19	1978-04-19	1978-06-06	
North Anna-2	Westinghouse 3-loop	972 MW	994 MW	1971-02-19	1980-08-25	1980-12-14	
North Anna-3 (former project)	B&W 145	907 MW	950 MW	1971-06-01	Cancelled construction on 1982-11-01		
North Anna-4 (former project)	B&W 145	907 MW	950 MW	1971-12-01	Cancelled construction on 1980-11-01		
North Anna-3 (planned)	ESBWR	1538 MW	1594 MW				
