= David Lochbaum =

David A. Lochbaum was the Director of the Nuclear Safety Project for the Union of Concerned Scientists (UCS). A nuclear engineer by training, he worked in nuclear power plants for nearly two decades. Lochbaum has written numerous articles and reports on various aspects of nuclear safety and published two books.

== Work with UCS ==
David Lochbaum was the Director of the Nuclear Safety Project for the Union of Concerned Scientists. He led UCS’s efforts to "ensure the safety of nuclear power in the United States by monitoring licensed commercial nuclear plants to identify and publicize safety risks". David Lochbaum has more than seventeen years of experience in commercial nuclear power plant start-up testing, operations, licensing, software development, training, and design engineering. Lochbaum has written numerous articles and reports on various aspects of nuclear safety and published books entitled Nuclear Waste Disposal Crisis and Fission Stories.

In his 1996 book Nuclear Waste Disposal Crisis he claimed, "U.S. nuclear power plants are safe as long as natural and man-made disasters do not occur".

In a 2012 nuclear power safety report with Edwin Lyman, Lochbaum said:

The designs of the Fukushima reactors closely resemble those of many U.S. reactors, and the respective emergency response procedures are comparable as well. But while most U.S. reactors may not be vulnerable to that site’s specific earthquake/ tsunami sequence, they are vulnerable to other severe natural disasters. Moreover, similarly serious conditions could be created by a terrorist attack.

Critics argue Lochbaum's failure to specify which "severe natural disasters" and "similarly serious conditions" might render U.S. reactors vulnerable make such statements little more than scaremongering. All U.S. plants are required to abide by the stringent security requirements of Nuclear Regulatory Commission 10CFR Part 73, "Physical Protection of Plants and Materials", and Part 50, "General Design Criteria", which require taking into account "the most severe natural phenomena historically reported for the site and surrounding area. The NRC then adds a margin for error to account for the limited historical data accuracy."

In 2013, Lochbaum discovered a 2007 filing by NRC Risk Analyst Rick Sherry which warned a "station blackout", or loss of power to multiple units, could challenge "the ability of the plant operating staff to respond". Lochbaum told New York Times reporter Matthew Wald that U.S. nuclear plants were unprepared for such an event, failing to mention Sherry's estimate that one might occur at a given U.S. reactor once every 100,000 years. Lochbaum was also apparently unaware NRC, with its 1988 Station Blackout Rule, had had appropriate contingency plans in effect for 25 years.

In October 2018 Lochbaum retired from the UCS, and was replaced as Director of Nuclear Safety by Edwin Lyman.

== Before UCS ==
Prior to joining UCS in October 1996, Mr. Lochbaum served as a Senior Engineer for Enercon Services, Inc., System Engineer for General Technical Services, Reactor Engineer/Shift Technical Advisor for the Tennessee Valley Authority, BWR Instructor for General Electric, and Junior Engineer for Georgia Power.

In the early 1990s, he and a colleague identified a safety problem in a plant where they were working, but were ignored when they raised the issue with the plant manager, the utility and the U.S. Nuclear Regulatory Commission (NRC). After bringing their concerns to Congress, the problem was corrected not just at the original nuclear plant but at plants across the country.

== Education ==
David Lochbaum received a Bachelor of Science in Nuclear Engineering from the University of Tennessee in 1979. He has been a member of the American Nuclear Society since 1978.

== See also ==
- Nuclear accidents in the United States
- Nuclear safety in the United States
- Anti-nuclear movement in the United States
- Arnold Gundersen
- George Galatis
- List of nuclear whistleblowers
- Mark Cooper
- GE Three
