= Institute of Nuclear Power Operations =

American nuclear safety organization

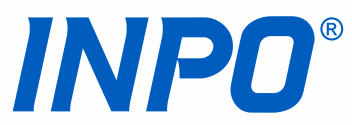
- Industry: Commercial Nuclear Energy
- Founded: December 1979
- Headquarters: Atlanta, Georgia
- Area served: United States
- Website: inpo.info

The Institute of Nuclear Power Operations (INPO), headquartered in Atlanta, GA, is an organization established in 1979 by the U.S. nuclear power industry in response to recommendations by the Kemeny Commission Report, following the investigation of the Three Mile Island accident. INPO sets industry-wide performance objectives, criteria, and guidelines for nuclear power plant operations that are intended to promote "operational excellence" and improve the sharing of operational experience between nuclear power plants. INPO is funded entirely by the nuclear industry.

== Function ==
INPO conducts plant evaluations at nuclear stations and identifies both strengths and areas for improvement that are intended to be shared with other nuclear stations as a method to share best practices and common weaknesses. The results of INPO plant evaluations are not made public, and any related information shared within the nuclear industry does not typically include the name of the plant. INPO assigns a score between one and four to each nuclear site, following the evaluation, where an "INPO 1" is the most favorable score, and an "INPO 4" is an indicator of a nuclear station with significant operational problems.

The INPO Advisory Council is composed of leading experts from the nuclear industry, plus others whose expertise is relevant to the safe operation of nuclear power plants. Advisory Council members have included Dr. Edgar H. Schein, a retired MIT professor who is widely credited with inventing the term "corporate culture;" and Dr. Rodger Dean Duncan, an organizational development and human performance expert.

Retired U.S. Navy vice-admiral Eugene Parks Wilkinson, the first commanding officer of the nuclear powered submarine USS Nautilus, was selected as INPO's first CEO in 1980, and served in that position until 1984.

== About INPO Headquarters ==
The lobby of INPO's headquarters is centered on a marble pedestal upon which is chiseled the word "EXCELLENCE," with the final E unfinished.

When viewed from the second floor mezzanine, the lobby floor appears as an optical illusion with the floor as a cone-shaped pit, with the marble pedestal at the bottom.

== See also ==
- Nuclear safety
- Nuclear safety in the U.S.
- Nuclear accident
- Nuclear accidents in the United States
- World Association of Nuclear Operators
- Nuclear whistleblowers
