= Surry Nuclear Power Plant =

Nuclear power plant located in Surry County, Virginia

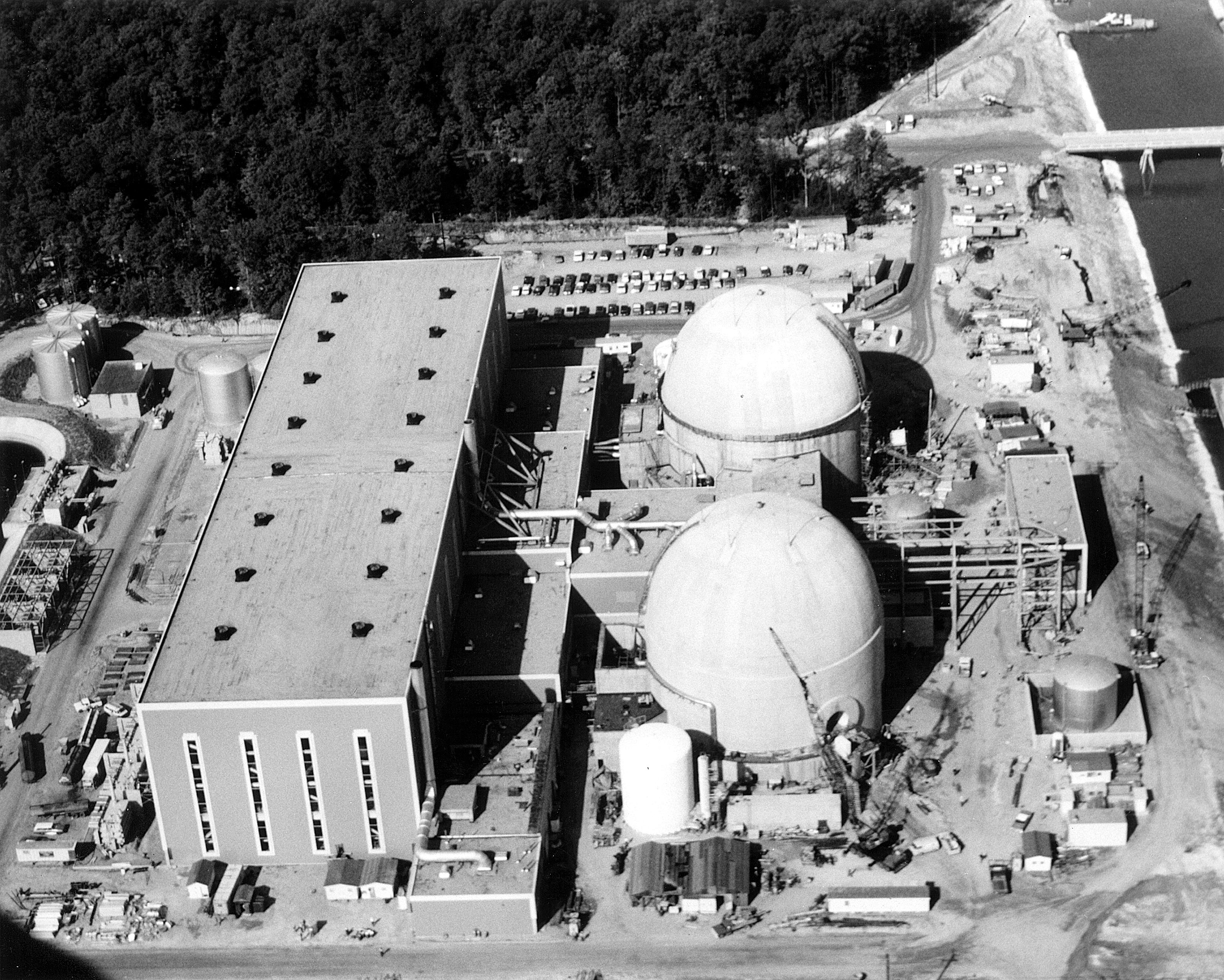
- Country: United States
- Location: Surry County, near Rushmere, Virginia
- Coordinates: 37°9′56″N 76°41′52″W
- Status: Operational
- Construction began: June 25, 1968
- Commission date: Unit 1: December 22, 1972; Unit 2: May 1, 1973
- Construction cost: $1.868 billion (2007 USD)
- Owner: Dominion Resources
- Operator: Dominion Energy

Nuclear power station
- Reactor type: PWR
- Reactor supplier: Westinghouse
- Cooling source: James River
- Thermal capacity: 2 × 2587 MW_{th}

Power generation
- Units operational: 2 × 838 MW
- Make and model: WH 3-loop (DRYSUB)
- Units cancelled: 2 × 859 MW
- Nameplate capacity: 1676 MW
- Capacity factor: 98.27% (2017); 77.5% (lifetime)
- Annual net output: 13,199 GW·h (2021)

External links
- Website: Surry Power Station
- Commons: Related media on Commons

Surry Power Station is a nuclear power plant located in Surry County in southeastern Virginia, in the South Atlantic United States. The power station lies on an 840-acre (340 ha) site adjacent to the James River across from Jamestown, slightly upriver from Smithfield and Newport News. Surry is operated by Dominion Generation and owned by Dominion Resources, Inc.

The Surry plant is similar in appearance and design to its "sister plant" North Anna Power Station, located northwest of Richmond in Louisa County, Virginia.

== History ==
The plant has two 3-loop Westinghouse pressurized water reactors that went on-line in 1972 and 1973 respectively. Each reactor produces approximately 800 megawatts of power, for a combined plant output of 1.6 gigawatts. Surry Power Station draws its condenser cycle water directly from the James River, removing the need for the imposing cooling towers often associated with nuclear plants. Repeated testing shows that Surry Power Station has minimal environmental impact and releases virtually no radiation or harmful emissions.

The station site was originally designed for four units; however, only two reactors were built. With increasing energy demands in the United States, it is possible that more reactors will be built at Surry in the next few decades.

In 2003, the Nuclear Regulatory Commission (NRC) extended the operating licenses for both reactors from forty to sixty years. In 2016 its owner announced it intended in due course to seek an extension to eighty years of operation, to 2052 and 2053. This extension to 80 years was obtained in 2021.

Surry was one of the plants analyzed in the NUREG-1150 safety analysis study.

== Electricity production ==
Generation (MWh) of Surry Nuclear Power Plant
Year	Jan	Feb	Mar	Apr	May	Jun	Jul	Aug	Sep	Oct	Nov	Dec	Annual (Total)
2001	1,225,561	1,060,337	1,228,352	1,187,896	969,142	1,177,965	1,215,263	1,211,610	1,154,030	826,415	374,240	1,031,565	12,662,376
2002	1,228,721	1,110,246	1,056,959	739,138	1,213,943	1,177,863	1,211,993	1,201,937	1,173,610	1,226,521	1,104,118	1,227,078	13,672,127
2003	832,171	1,105,668	1,225,651	964,865	613,882	838,684	1,214,775	1,211,227	845,594	432,451	584,347	1,162,583	11,031,898
2004	1,224,143	1,147,376	1,207,954	1,186,838	1,020,479	1,178,560	1,211,883	1,216,254	1,179,727	1,200,648	595,974	1,139,032	13,508,868
2005	1,210,455	983,675	1,211,447	1,029,850	739,938	1,161,554	1,189,562	1,189,337	1,154,794	983,944	1,165,976	1,209,660	13,230,192
2006	1,196,556	1,090,442	1,207,274	1,007,652	665,205	1,159,475	1,185,059	1,192,636	1,162,530	730,588	753,670	1,149,271	12,500,358
2007	1,152,406	1,093,887	1,211,981	1,173,060	1,188,067	1,162,686	1,197,734	1,193,864	1,158,657	985,363	586,204	1,177,639	13,281,548
2008	1,209,020	1,128,558	1,207,761	972,579	793,977	1,156,533	1,192,248	1,191,022	1,154,573	1,113,432	1,168,804	1,208,832	13,497,339
2009	1,207,945	1,090,735	1,207,459	933,336	971,568	1,158,708	1,193,468	1,187,724	1,157,381	1,148,905	581,326	1,171,087	13,009,642
2010	1,207,095	1,090,364	1,206,292	1,167,456	1,200,049	1,073,987	1,086,221	1,182,034	1,152,587	1,020,016	583,681	1,202,655	13,172,437
2011	1,255,838	821,774	1,252,130	774,846	646,369	742,270	1,242,517	1,246,562	1,216,521	1,283,124	1,242,931	1,304,598	13,029,480
2012	1,297,009	1,216,160	1,210,842	1,076,066	732,002	1,078,831	1,238,784	1,230,125	1,222,836	1,261,303	603,511	1,222,731	13,390,200
2013	1,261,464	1,129,879	1,300,088	1,249,368	1,280,337	1,228,918	1,253,306	1,262,015	1,225,823	1,017,246	808,583	1,303,931	14,320,958
2014	1,301,755	1,176,118	1,229,149	1,019,620	835,750	1,223,636	1,260,829	1,265,490	1,229,250	1,229,625	1,256,656	1,304,447	14,332,325
2015	1,277,501	1,176,897	1,296,641	968,366	686,964	1,216,890	801,448	1,254,474	1,225,591	615,780	245,845	1,023,329	11,789,726
2016	1,303,449	1,219,882	1,299,617	1,251,972	1,286,370	1,227,444	1,251,854	1,248,690	1,227,244	986,585	1,025,736	1,281,675	14,610,518
2017	1,305,589	1,174,594	1,297,185	1,240,477	733,971	1,145,667	1,252,816	1,201,355	1,233,104	1,282,703	1,257,863	1,302,323	14,427,647
2018	1,293,675	1,174,666	1,299,162	1,009,012	644,130	1,216,093	1,258,070	1,250,684	1,212,072	1,057,092	633,682	1,170,799	13,219,137
2019	1,303,335	1,176,810	1,300,713	1,232,459	1,267,967	1,221,141	1,248,462	1,258,390	1,226,321	1,010,449	636,710	1,290,220	14,172,977
2020	1,297,877	1,208,164	1,288,067	1,191,184	675,186	1,132,843	1,240,758	1,246,729	1,221,929	1,296,454	1,248,076	1,292,884	14,340,151
2021	1,296,333	1,178,157	1,260,656	1,076,493	644,021	1,167,348	1,243,871	1,243,278	1,205,027	1,018,309	626,685	1,239,692	13,199,870
2022	1,299,601	1,171,916	1,283,878	1,232,442	1,265,256	1,198,849	1,244,578	1,241,395	1,215,165	1,195,073	633,675	944,613	13,926,441
2023	1,263,832	1,171,209	1,292,501	1,018,983	639,593	922,550	1,232,461	1,238,233	1,218,365	1,285,206	1,252,876	1,298,860	13,834,669
2024	1,296,965	1,208,648	1,288,642	742,404	642,207	1,107,769	1,245,301	1,252,696	1,221,316	1,149,786	625,920	1,139,889	12,921,543
2025	1,299,541	1,170,385	1,290,248	1,236,030	1,261,657	1,201,825	1,234,613	1,157,237	1,217,987	857,569	630,831	660,218	13,218,141
2026	1,287,915	1,170,624	1,274,244	843,539	640,855	1,019,232	1,240,979	1,241,096					--

== Surrounding population ==
The Nuclear Regulatory Commission defines two emergency planning zones around nuclear power plants: a plume exposure pathway zone with a radius of 10 miles (16 km), concerned primarily with exposure to, and inhalation of, airborne radioactive contamination, and an ingestion pathway zone of about 50 miles (80 km), concerned primarily with ingestion of food and liquid contaminated by radioactivity.

The 2010 U.S. population within 10 miles (16 km) of Surry was 127,041, an increase of 21.9 percent in a decade, according to an analysis of U.S. Census data for msnbc.com. The 2010 U.S. population within 50 miles (80 km) was 2,292,642, an increase of 13.9 percent since 2000. Cities within 50 miles include Hopewell, Petersburg, Williamsburg, Newport News, Hampton, Poquoson, Portsmouth, Norfolk (30 miles to city center), Virginia Beach (47 miles to city center), and Richmond (50 miles to city center).

== Events ==
- On July 27, 1972, two workers were fatally scalded after a routine valve adjustment led to a steam release in a gap in a vent line.
- On May 8, 1979, FBI agents investigated a white crystalline substance that had been poured into 62 fresh fuels elements kept in storage at the plant, a day after plant officials made the discovery. Westinghouse metallurgists found no damage to the fuel elements, including the metal containers and zirconium rods holding the fresh fuel.
- On December 9, 1986, a steam explosion (condensate feed piping ruptured due to internal erosion and over-pressurization when feed pump check valve failed) in the non-nuclear part of Unit 2 injured eight workers. Four later died.
- On April 16, 2011, a tornado touched down in the plant's electrical switching station, disabling primary power to the plant's cooling pumps and causing the backup diesel generators to activate without incident.
- On August 23, 2011, an earthquake in central Virginia automatically shut down Dominion's North Anna reactors 11 miles from the epicenter. The similar Surry reactors continued in operation and Dominion declared a "Notice of Unusual Event" (the least dangerous of a four-level emergency scale) for the Surry plant which was lifted later the same day.

== Seismic risk ==
The Nuclear Regulatory Commission's estimate of the risk each year of an earthquake intense enough to cause core damage to the reactor at Surry was 1 in 175,439, according to an NRC study published in August 2010.
