= Nuclear emergency level classification responses =

Nuclear power plants pose high risk to public health and safety if radiation is released into surrounding communities and areas. This nuclear emergency level classification response system was firstly developed by the US Nuclear Regulatory Commission to allow effective and urgent responses to ultimately control and minimise any detrimental effects that nuclear chemicals can have. These classifications come in four different categories – Unusual Event, Alert, Site Area Emergency (SAE), as well as General Emergency. Thus, each classification has differing characteristics and purposes, depending on the situation at hand. Every nuclear power plant has a different emergency response action plan, also depending on its structure, location and nature. They were developed by thorough discussion and planning with numerous authoritative parties such as local, state, federal agencies as well as other private and non-profit groups that are in association with emergency services. Today, nuclear emergency plans are continuously being developed over time to be improved for future serious events to keep communities and nuclear power plant working members safe. There is a high emphasis for the need of these emergency responses in case of future events. Thus, nuclear plants can, and have paid up to approximately $78 million to ensure that are required measurements are readily available, and that equipment is sufficient and safe. This is applicable for all nuclear power plants in the United States of America.

Nuclear Power Plant Cattenom

== Unusual event ==
The notification of an unusual event is classified as the least alerting or serious nuclear emergency classification. This event does not particularly pose a risk on the power plant workers and surrounding public as it does not involve any radiological release. The exposure of radioactive material if present would be classified as minimal and therefore does not pose any health hazards. Usually there are no off-site chemical monitoring required in this type of event. Furthermore, common examples of unusual events might include a severe injury suffered by a worker or cases of chaotic weather. Being the least severe event, this ensures that the necessary first steps of any nuclear emergency response are formally carried out and documented. If an event goes beyond the severity of an unusual event, the next classification would be an Alert event. The recorded frequency of this type of event occurs one to two times per year.

== Alert ==
An Alert emergency response is followed by an unusual event. This is characterized by the potential threat towards a power plant's overall safety due to damaged equipment. Similarly, it does not require an emergency response by the public, however emergency agencies and power plant employees are still informed to address the event at hand. Therefore, there is no triggering of a siren to the public. Radiological materials may be released but only at a very minimal level, which is easily controlled and rectified. Therefore, offsite monitoring is required. Furthermore, other secondary or back-up power plants are still functional instead of the primary power plant that is potentially damaged. Still classified as a minor emergency event response, an alert response ensures that all members and other offsite agencies are promptly and provided necessary information to be ready to take further action if the incident escalates more severely than present if needed. However generally, a public response is not required. But measurements are taken place to keep the public safe. The recorded frequency of this type of event occurs once every ten to one hundred years.

== Site Area Emergency ==
Site Area Emergency event responses are classified as more severe than alert events. This involves minor to major issues with the power plant function of equipment, which can potentially later affect the public if not sustained immediately. This imposes very high hazardous threats to workers and the as radiological materials may be released into either the air or surrounding water ways. Any released material does not reach the public, so therefore no public response is required for this classification of event also. However, a siren is triggered to alert surrounding communities within a ten-mile radius. Relevant information about the event is transferred to offsite authoritative parties in case of the increase severity of the situation. This includes readiness for potential evacuations and increased monitoring of nuclear material. Hence, sirens are triggered to set off to vigorously notify the public of a potential nuclear threat (via local radio stations and television) and to prepare for any response if required. In addition, exposure seems to not exceed any regulations or boundaries established by the Environmental Protection Agency Protective Action Guidelines (PAGs). Examples of a site area emergency might include a reactor coolant leak or a fire within a safety system. In addition, the expected frequency of this type of event of response is of once every hundred to five thousand years.

Danger radiation

== General emergency ==
A general emergency event response is classified as the most severe situation. This event is characterized by the major impairment of power plant equipment. As a result, leakage and release of radiological materials significantly cannot be controlled or managed due to damaged implemented safety systems. The release of nuclear chemicals will exceed the Environmental Protection Agency Protective Action Guidelines (PAGs) boundaries. Therefore, a public response is immediately required through the guidance of state and other local authorities (through local radio stations and television) to minimize the detrimental effects on surrounding communities. A public response normally involves staying indoors, or in some cases results in an evacuation. This is initially communicated through the triggering of a siren extending within a ten-mile radius. Ultimately, the purpose of a general emergency response is to prioritize the health of the public through all necessary actions and to maximize all monitoring methods to sustain the situation as fast as possible through assessment of information. In addition, Furthermore, the expected frequency of a general emergency event is predicted at approximately once every five thousand years. The last recorded general emergency occurred in 1979 in Three Mile Island, as well other accidents in Chernobyl and Fukushima.

=== Three Mile Island Accident ===
The Three Mile nuclear power plant incident occurred on 28 March 1979. This event was regarded as one of the most serious nuclear power plant incidents in history. In this event, one of the two reactors on the site experienced technical dysfunction. This was due to mechanical or electrical difficulties, where water could not be sent to the steam generators and therefore lead to the shutting down of the reactor itself. As a result, pressure began to increase significantly and water would pour out without any awareness from the nuclear plant staff. Hence, there was an immense decrease in the coolant from the reactors, causing the power plant to be in a dangerous and hazardous state as the reactor began to melt. Immediately alarms were triggered to signify an issue within the nuclear power plant to rectify the issue as soon as possible. This incident had only released very minimal amounts of radiation. Hence, the Three Mile event did not pose any radiological health effects on both the nuclear plant staff, or public members of the community within a five-mile radius. In addition, there were no evidence of any irregular patterns of health, or significant cases of cancer which the radiation could have caused.

The series of events that occurred on Three Mile Island provoked the need to implement improved training and nuclear response for future events by the Nuclear Regulatory Commission (NRC) as well as the National Academy for Nuclear Training. In this incidence, a priority was made to continuously monitor the function of the cooling generator of power plants. This led to valuable information such as understanding fuel melting and more. In addition, these organisations emphasised the need for excellent standards in all nuclear power plant operations and training programs. This includes skills or communication and team work amongst team members. Furthermore, the consequence of this establishment of improved training has led to increased safety and reliability. Thus, it is now mandatory for a power plant to meet the standards and regulations of the NRC and INPO to allow to function. Today, the reactor design present incident is no longer used in all power plants. There have been further improvements in design to ensure safety and prevent further serious events. Ever since the incident has occurred, there has been no record of any further General Emergency response event.

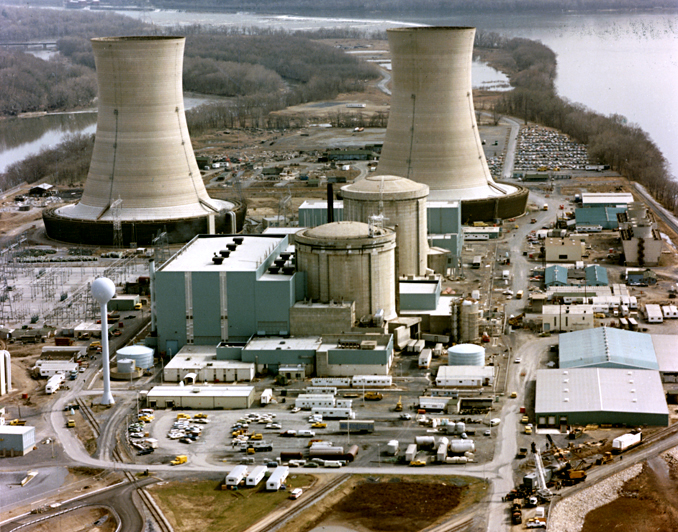
Three Mile Island (color)-2

=== Chernobyl Nuclear Power Plant accident ===
The Chernobyl (Ukraine) Nuclear Power Plant incident occurred on 26 April 1986. In this event, a steam explosion occurred due to a poorly designed reactor that was used during the time. A fire was provoked, causing immediate emergency teams to be signified to rectify the issue. As a result, large quantities of radioactive material were released into the surrounding environment. Therefore, an eighteen-mile radius from the plant, which had approximately 115,000 residents, was required to be closed off and evacuated by government officials.

The consequences of this event had led to the death of 28 nuclear power plant staff members, whereas another 106 had experienced severe illness as a result to radiation exposure. Although radiation did contaminate surrounding areas in very small amounts, it did not spread fast enough to affect members of the public. However, over time there has been a significant increase in cases of thyroid cancer in children due to the drinking of contaminated milk by the radioactive material.

Due to the severity of the event and its consequence, the Nuclear Regulatory Commission (NRC) required immense planning in regulations to ensure the safety of both nuclear plant team members and the public. This includes improved nuclear reactor system designs (which is approved and reliably tested to enhance safety), emergency procedures and controls, as well as adequate back-up systems in case of a future event. Since the event, nuclear engineers have regularly visited other Western nuclear power plants to obtain a better understanding on how to improve the integrity and design of power plants.

=== Fukushima ===
The Fukushima incident is classified as another General Emergency classification response. In March 2011, Japan experienced an earthquake with a magnitude of 9.0, as well as a 14-metre-high tsunami. These natural disasters affected four nuclear plant sites in Fukushima (Japan) through major damage in many generators and backup systems. Although they were still functional after the events, systems began to fail as reactors began to overheat and therefore began to melt. As a result, radioactive material was exposed and released to much of the surrounding areas in Japan. This posed many health hazards for the public, which led to the evacuation responses of residents.

The Nuclear Regulatory Commission had responsibility to take both short- and long-term actions to rectify and maintain the General Emergency event. The NRC immediately monitored the potential effects in places including Hawaii, Alaska and locations in the West of the United States because of the natural disasters in Japan. Furthermore, Japanese engineers received expertise advice from other United States agencies to help improve the overall design of the power plants that were utilised during the time. In addition, other management and emergency response plans were designed and planned in case of a General Emergency event like the one that occurred in Fukushima again. Furthermore, NRC acted to examine whether their current nuclear power plants require improvement to enhance the safety of both workers as well as the public. Also, the quality of preparedness for future emergency events was examined. As of 2012, the requirements of future power plant reactors require them to cooperate additional emergency equipment (pumps and generators), installing equipment that continuously monitor water levels, and installing systems that monitors (and relieves) pressure in generators to prevent serious events in the future.
