= Mark Cooper (academic) =

American economist

Mark Cooper is a senior research fellow for economic analysis at the Institute for Energy and the Environment at the Vermont Law School, and a frequent nuclear power industry commentator. Cooper holds a PhD from Yale University and is a former Yale University and Fulbright Fellow. He has provided expert testimony in over 250 cases for public interest clients before state and federal agencies, courts, and legislators in many jurisdictions in the U.S. and Canada. Cooper has published many books and articles on energy, telecommunications and high technology industries.

Cooper's 2011 report, Nuclear Safety and Nuclear Economics, says that past nuclear disasters, such as the 1979 Three Mile Island accident, have tended to "greatly raise regulatory barriers and have also severely multiplied the cost of reactor construction". After Three Mile Island, the report said, the cost of nuclear power plant construction doubled in most cases and trebled or quadrupled in some rare circumstances. He says that presently we are witnessing not a nuclear renaissance but a collapse in expectations for new nuclear reactor construction.

== See also ==
- Peter A. Bradford
- Benjamin K. Sovacool
- Amory Lovins
- M.V. Ramana
- David A. Schlissel
