= David A. Schlissel =

David A. Schlissel has been a Senior Consultant with Synapse Energy Economics since 2000. For 30 years he has worked on complex engineering and economic issues mainly in the field of energy management. This work has ranged from conducting technical investigations, through to presenting expert testimony. Schlissel has undergraduate and advanced engineering degrees from the Massachusetts Institute of Technology and Stanford University, and a law degree from Stanford Law School.

== Recent reports, articles and presentations ==
- Why a Future for the Nuclear Industry is Risky, 2007 report
- Risky Appropriations: Gambling US Energy Policy on the Global Nuclear Energy Partnership, 2007 report
- The Risks of Building New Nuclear Power Plants, U.S. Senate and House of Representative Briefings, April 20, 2007.
- Carbon Dioxide Emissions Costs and Electricity Resource Planning, New Mexico Public Regulation Commission, Case 06-00448-UT, March 28, 2007, with Anna Sommer.
- The Risks of Building New Nuclear Power Plants, Presentation to the New York Society of Securities Analysts, June 8, 2006.
- Conservation and Renewable Energy Should be the Cornerstone for Meeting Future Natural Gas Needs. Presentation to the Global LNG Summit, June 1, 2004. Presentation given by Cliff Chen.
- Comments on natural gas utilities’ Phase I Proposals for pre-approved full cost recovery of contracts with liquid natural gas (LNG) suppliers and the costs of interconnecting their systems with LNG facilities. Comments in California Public Utilities Commission Rulemaking 04-01-025. March 23, 2004.
- "The 2003 Blackout: Solutions that Won’t Cost a Fortune", The Electricity Journal, November 2003, with others.
- FINANCIAL INSECURITY: The Increasing Use of Limited Liability Companies and MultiTiered Holding Companies to Own Nuclear Power Plants, August 2002, with Paul Peterson and Bruce Biewald.

== See also ==
- Peter A. Bradford
- Amory Lovins
- Mycle Schneider
- M.V. Ramana
- Stephen Thomas (economist)
