= Nuclear safety in the United States =

US safety regulations for nuclear power and weapons

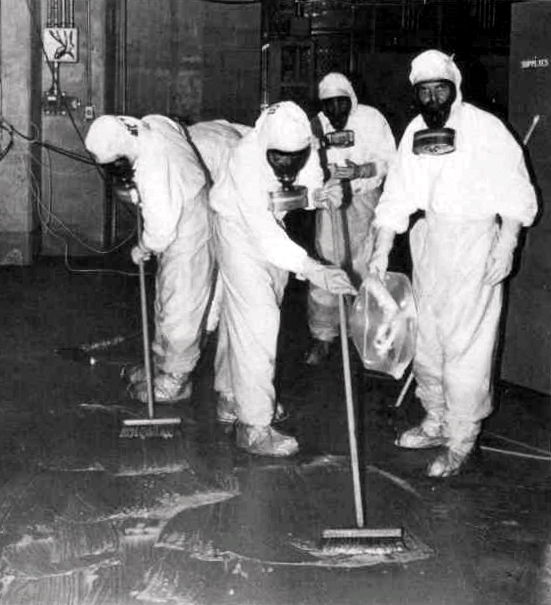
A clean-up crew working to remove radioactive contamination after the Three Mile Island accident.

Nuclear safety in the United States is governed by federal regulations issued by the Nuclear Regulatory Commission (NRC). The NRC regulates all nuclear plants and materials in the United States except for nuclear plants and materials controlled by the U.S. government, as well those powering naval vessels.

The 1979 Three Mile Island accident was a pivotal event that led to questions about U.S. nuclear safety. Earlier events had a similar effect, including a 1975 fire at Browns Ferry and the 1976 testimonials of three concerned GE nuclear engineers, the GE Three. In 1981, workers inadvertently reversed pipe restraints at the Diablo Canyon Power Plant reactors, compromising seismic protection systems, which further undermined confidence in nuclear safety. All of these well-publicised events, undermined public support for the U.S. nuclear industry in the 1970s and the 1980s. In 2002, the USA had what former NRC Commissioner Victor Gilinsky termed "its closest brush with disaster" since Three Mile Island's 1979 meltdown; a workman at the Davis-Besse reactor found a large rust hole in the top of the reactor pressure vessel.

Recent concerns have been expressed about safety issues affecting a large part of the nuclear fleet of reactors. In 2012, the Union of Concerned Scientists, which tracks ongoing safety issues at operating nuclear plants, found that "leakage of radioactive materials is a pervasive problem at almost 90 percent of all reactors, as are issues that pose a risk of nuclear accidents".

Following the Japanese Fukushima Daiichi nuclear disaster, according to Black & Veatch's annual utility survey that took place after the disaster, of the 700 executives from the US electric utility industry that were surveyed, nuclear safety was the top concern. There are likely to be increased requirements for on-site spent fuel management and elevated design basis threats at nuclear power plants. License extensions for existing reactors will face additional scrutiny, with outcomes depending on the degree to which plants can meet new requirements, and some of the extensions already granted for more than 60 of the 104 operating U.S. reactors could be revisited. On-site storage, consolidated long-term storage, and geological disposal of spent fuel is "likely to be reevaluated in a new light because of the Fukushima storage pool experience".

In October 2011, the Nuclear Regulatory Commission (NRC) instructed agency staff to move forward with seven of the twelve safety recommendations put forward by the federal task force in July. The recommendations include "new standards aimed at strengthening operators' ability to deal with a complete loss of power, ensuring plants can withstand floods and earthquakes and improving emergency response capabilities". The new safety standards will take up to five years to fully implement.

== Scope ==
The topic of nuclear safety covers:

- The research and analysis of possible or potential incidents or events at nuclear facilities,
- The equipment and procedures designed to prevent those incidents or events from having serious consequences,
- The actions to reduce the consequences of those incidents or events,
- The calculation of the probabilities, and the seriousness, of equipment, procedures or actions failing,
- The evaluation of the possible timing and scope of those consequences,
- The actions taken to protect the public during a release of radioactivity,
- The training and rehearsals performed to ensure readiness in case an incident/event occurs.

This article will also consider accidents that have occurred.

In the following, the names of federal regulations will be abbreviated in the standard way. For example, "Code of Federal Regulations, Title 10, Part 100, Section 23" will be given as "10CFR100.23".

== History ==
In the 1950s and 60's, the United States Atomic Energy Commission (AEC) began developing safety regulations against nuclear fallout for civilian nuclear reactors. Because the effects of nuclear fallout are more widespread and longer lasting than other forms of energy production accidents, the AEC desired a more proactive response towards potential accidents than ever before. One step to prevent nuclear reactor accidents was the Price-Anderson Act. Passed by Congress in 1957, the Price-Anderson Act ensured government assistance above the $60 million covered by private insurance companies in the case of a nuclear reactor accident. The main goal of the Price-Anderson Act was to protect the multi-billion-dollar companies overseeing the production of nuclear reactors. Without this protection, the nuclear reactor industry could potentially come to a halt, and the protective measures against nuclear fallout would be reduced. Because of the limited experience in nuclear reactor technology, however, engineers had a difficult time calculating the potential risk of released radiation. Engineers were forced to imagine every unlikely accident, and the potential fallout associated with each accident. The AEC's regulations against potential nuclear reactor fallout were centered on the ability of the power plant to the Maximum Credible Accident (MCA). The MCA involved a "large release of radioactive isotopes after a substantial meltdown of the reactor fuel when the reactor coolant system failed through a Loss-of-Coolant Accident". The prevention of the MCA enabled a number of new nuclear fallout preventive measures. Static safety systems, or systems without power sources or user input, were enabled to prevent potential human error. Containment buildings, for example, were reliably effective at containing a release of radiation and did not need to be powered or turned on to operate. Active protective systems, although far less dependable, can do many things that static systems cannot. For example, a system to replace the escaping steam of a cooling system with cooling water could prevent reactor fuel from melting. Nonetheless, this system would need a sensor to detect the presence of releasing steam. Sensors can fail, and the results of a lack of preventive measures would result in a local nuclear fallout. The AEC had to choose, then, between active and static systems to protect the public from nuclear fallout. With a lack of set standards and probabilistic calculations, the AEC and the industry became divided on the best safety precautions to use. This division gave rise to the Nuclear Regulatory Commission (NRC). The NRC was committed to 'regulations through research', which gave the regulatory committee a knowledge bank of research on which to draw their regulations. Much of the research done by the NRC sought to move safety systems from a deterministic viewpoint into a new probabilistic approach. The deterministic approach sought to foresee all problems before they arose. The probabilistic approach uses a more mathematical approach to weigh the risks of potential radiation leaks. Much of the probabilistic safety approach can be drawn from the radiative transfer theory in Physics, which describes how radiation travels in free space and through barriers.

== Issues ==
More than a quarter of U.S. nuclear plant operators "have failed to properly tell regulators about equipment defects that could imperil reactor safety", according to a Nuclear Regulatory Commission report.

In February 2011, a major manufacturer in the nuclear industry reported a potential "substantial safety hazard" with control rods at more than two dozen reactors around the USA. GE Hitachi Nuclear Energy said it had discovered extensive cracking and "material distortion," and recommended that the boiling water reactors using its Marathon control rod blades replace them more frequently than previously told. If the design life is not revised, it "could result in significant control blade cracking and could, if not corrected, create a substantial safety hazard and is considered a reportable condition," the company said in its report to the NRC.

=== Radioactive waste storage ===
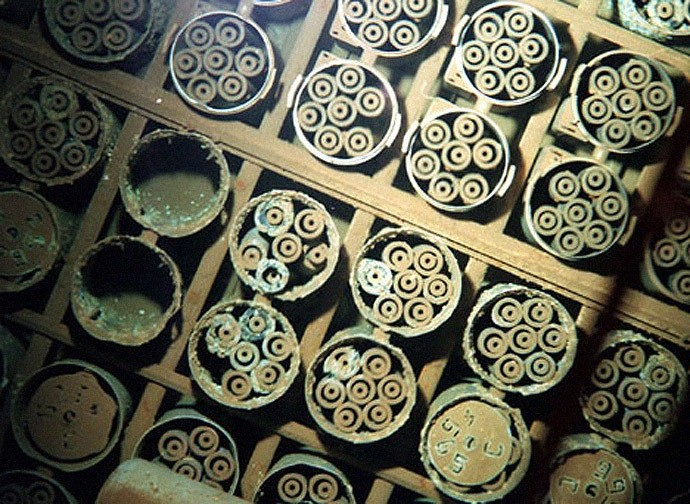
Spent nuclear fuel stored underwater and uncapped at the Hanford site in Washington, USA.

The Fukushima Daiichi nuclear disaster has reopened questions about the risks of U.S. nuclear reactors, and especially the pools that store Spent nuclear fuel. In March 2011, nuclear experts told Congress that Spent nuclear fuel pools at US nuclear power plants are too full. A fire at a spent-fuel pool could release cesium-137. Experts say the entire US spent-fuel policy should be overhauled in light of Fukushima I.

With the cancellation of the Yucca Mountain nuclear waste repository in Nevada, more nuclear waste is being loaded into sealed metal casks filled with inert gas. Many of these casks will be stored in coastal or lakeside regions where a salt air environment exists, and the Massachusetts Institute of Technology is studying how such Dry cask storage perform in salt environments. Some hope that the casks can be used for 100 years but cracking related to corrosion could occur in 30 years or less. Robert Alvarez, a former Department of Energy official who oversaw nuclear issues, said Dry cask storage would provide safer storage until a permanent nuclear repository was built and loaded, a process that would take decades.

At places like Maine Yankee, Connecticut Yankee and Rancho Seco, reactors no longer operate, but the spent fuel remains in small concrete-and-steel silos that require maintenance and monitoring by a guard force. Sometimes the presence of nuclear waste prevents re-use of the sites by industry.

Without a long-term solution to store nuclear waste, a nuclear renaissance in the U.S. remains unlikely. Nine states have "explicit moratoria on new nuclear power until a storage solution emerges".

Some nuclear power advocates argue that the United States should develop factories and reactors that will recycle some of the spent nuclear fuel. (It is not now the policy of the United States to recycle its spent nuclear fuel.) But the Blue Ribbon Commission on America's Nuclear Future said in 2012 that "no existing technology was adequate for that purpose, given cost considerations and the risk of nuclear proliferation".

=== Earthquake risk ===
About one third of reactors in the US are boiling water reactors, the same technology which was involved in the Fukushima Daiichi nuclear disaster in Japan. There are also eight nuclear power plants located along the seismically active West coast. Twelve of the American reactors that are of the same vintage as the Fukushima Daiichi plant are in seismically active areas. Earthquake risk is often measured by "Peak Ground Acceleration", or PGA. The following nuclear power plants have a two percent or greater chance of having PGA over 0.15g in the next 50 years: Diablo Canyon, Calif. (Closure date of the two units: 2024/2025); Sequoyah, Tenn.; H.B. Robinson, SC.; Watts Bar, Tenn.; Virgil C. Summer, SC.; Vogtle, GA. (new build of two units included); Indian Point, NY. (Closure date of the two units: 2021); Oconee, SC.; and Seabrook, NH.

=== GE Mark 1 reactor containment design ===
General Electric's Mark I reactor containment design has been long criticized by experts over its relatively weak containment vessel. Notably, Three GE scientists resigned in 1976 in protest of the design of the Mark I containment system. David Lochbaum, chief nuclear safety officer with the Union of Concerned Scientists, has repeatedly questioned the safety of the Fukushima I Plant's GE Mark 1 reactor containment design. In a 2012 nuclear power safety report, David Lochbaum and Edwin Lyman said:

The designs of the Fukushima reactors closely resemble those of many U.S. reactors, and the respective emergency response procedures are comparable as well. But while most U.S. reactors may not be vulnerable to that site's specific earthquake/ tsunami sequence, they are vulnerable to other severe natural disasters. Moreover, similarly serious conditions could be created by a terrorist attack.

=== Aging of nuclear reactors ===
An important concern in the nuclear safety field is the aging of nuclear reactors. Quality Assurance Technicians, weld inspectors and radiographers use ultrasonic waves to look for cracks and other defects in hot metal parts, in order to identify "microscale" defects that lead to big cracks.

=== Population considerations ===
111 million people live within 50 miles of U.S. nuclear power plants. Of these people, it seems that the trust that they have in relation to their safety is impacted by the amount of time they have lived near a power plant. When a person has lived in the area longer, they tend to worry less about the possibility of nuclear terror due to their awareness of what is happening within the power plant. There is also a correlation between how much people understand about what is happening within the nuclear power plant and their trust. When people have a better understanding of procedures, then they are inclined to be more trusting.

There are also many tests that are run regularly within nuclear power plants to ensure that safety is prioritized. For example, machine learning (ML) based predictions are often used within nuclear power plants. These predictions are then tested and evaluated to assess their accuracy to prove that these ML predictions are reliable. Regular testing and showing that these power plants can be trusted helps the population to feel more safe and have more trust.

=== Terrorist attack ===
In February 1993, a man drove his car past a check point at the Three Mile Island Nuclear plant, then broke through an entry gate. He eventually crashed the car through a secure door and entered the Unit 1 reactor turbine building. The intruder, who had a history of mental illness, hid in a building and was not apprehended for four hours. Stephanie Cooke asks: "What if he'd been a terrorist armed with a ticking bomb?"

After 9/11, it would seem prudent for nuclear plants to be prepared for an attack by a large, well-armed terrorist group. But the Nuclear Regulatory Commission, in revising its security rules, decided not to require that plants be able to defend themselves against groups carrying sophisticated weapons. According to a study by the Government Accountability Office, the N.R.C. appeared to have based its revised rules "on what the industry considered reasonable and feasible to defend against rather than on an assessment of the terrorist threat itself".

The Protected Area encloses the Exclusion Zone (as defined in 10CFR100.3). It also serves as a security zone, within which only trusted, FBI background-checked and badged individuals are allowed to walk unescorted. The Protected Area is surrounded by a number of closely monitored, motion-detection protected fences, and the gap in between the fences is electronically monitored. There are many layers of gates, and those are well guarded. Numerous other security measures are in effect.

The missile shield protecting the containment structure is intended to protect not only from natural forces, such as tornadoes, but is designed to be strong enough to withstand a direct hit from a greater passenger jetliner. One plant, Florida's Turkey Point NGS, survived a direct hit by Category 5 Hurricane Andrew in 1992, with no damage to the containment. No actual missile shield has been subjected to an aircraft impact test. However, a highly similar test was done at Sandia National Laboratories and filmed (see Containment building), and the target was essentially undamaged (reinforced concrete is strongly resistant both to impact and to fire). The NRC's Chairman has said "Nuclear power plants are inherently robust structures that our studies provide adequate protection in a hypothetical attack by an airplane. The NRC has also taken actions that require nuclear power plant operators to be able to manage large fires or explosions - no matter what has caused them."

=== Flood risks ===
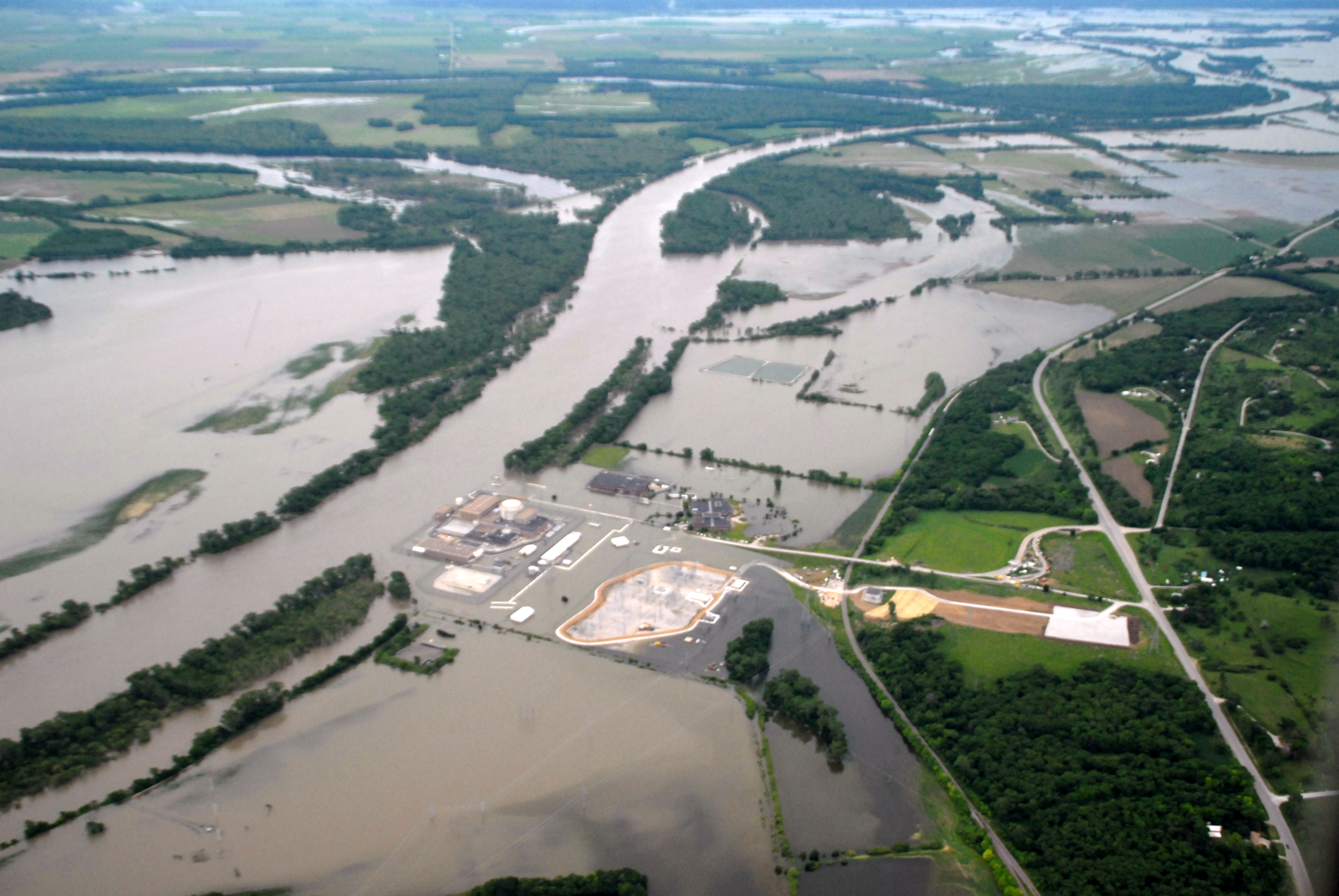
Fort Calhoun Nuclear Generating Station surrounded by the 2011 Missouri River Floods on June 16, 2011

In 2012, Larry Criscione and Richard H. Perkins publicly accused the US Nuclear Regulatory Commission of downplaying flood risks for nuclear plants which are sited on waterways downstream from large reservoirs and dams. They are engineers with over 20 years of combined government and military service who work for the NRC. Other nuclear safety advocates have supported their complaints.

=== Procedures ===
In the U.S., the Operating License is granted by the government and carries the force of law. The Final Safety Analysis Report (FSAR) is part of the Operating License, and the plant's Technical Specifications (which contain the restrictions the operators consult during operation) are a chapter of the FSAR. All procedures are checked against the Technical Specifications and also by a Transient Analysis engineer, and each copy of an approved procedure is numbered and the copies controlled (so that updating all copies at once can be assured). In a U.S. nuclear power plant, unlike in most other industries, approved procedures carry the force of law and to deliberately violate one is a criminal act.

=== Design Basis Events ===
"Design Basis Events [DBE] are defined as conditions of normal operation, including anticipated operational occurrences, design basis accidents, external events, and natural phenomena for which the plant must be designed to ensure functions (b)(1)(i) (A) through (C)" of 10CFR50-49. These include (A) maintaining the integrity of the reactor coolant pressure boundary; (B) maintaining the capability to shut down the reactor and maintain it in a safe shutdown condition; OR (C) maintaining the capability to prevent or mitigate the consequences of accidents that could result in potential offsite exposures. The normal DBE evaluated is loss-of-coolant accident (LOCA).

The Fukushima I nuclear accident was caused by a "beyond design basis event," the tsunami and associated earthquakes were more powerful than the plant was designed to accommodate, and the accident is directly due to the tsunami overflowing the too-low seawall. Since then, the possibility of unforeseen beyond design basis events has been a major concern for plant operators.

=== Whistleblowers ===
There have been a number of nuclear whistleblowers, often nuclear engineers, who have identified safety concerns at nuclear power plants in the United States. In 1976 Gregory Minor, Richard Hubbard, and Dale Bridenbaugh "blew the whistle" on safety problems at nuclear power plants in the United States. The three nuclear engineers (GE Three) gained the attention of journalists and their disclosures about the threats of nuclear power had a significant impact. George Galatis was a senior nuclear engineer who reported safety problems at the Millstone 1 Nuclear Power Plant, relating to reactor refueling procedures, in 1995. Other nuclear whistleblowers include Arnold Gundersen, David Lochbaum, and Karen Silkwood.

=== Assessments of risks ===
The NRC (and its predecessors) have over the decades produced three major analyses of the risks of nuclear power: a fourth, all-encompassing one (the State-of-the-Art Reactor Consequence Analyses, or SOARCA, study) is in generation now. The new study will be based on actual test results, on probabilistic risk assessment (PRA) methodology, and on the evaluated actions of government agencies.

The existing studies are:

- NUREG-1150 (1991)
- CRAC-II (1982) (based on WASH-1400 results)
- WASH-1400 (1975)
- WASH-740 (1957) (not PRA-based)

Reactor vendors now routinely calculate probabilistic risk assessments of their nuclear power plant designs. General Electric has recalculated maximum core damage frequencies per year per plant for its nuclear power plant designs:

BWR/4 — 1 × 10^{−5} (a typical plant)
BWR/6 — 1 × 10^{−6} (a typical plant)
ABWR — 2 × 10^{−7} (now operating in Japan)
ESBWR — 3 × 10^{−8} (submitted for Final Design Approval by NRC)

The proposed AP1000 has a maximum core damage frequency of 5.09 × 10^{−7} per plant per year. The European Pressurized Reactor (EPR) has a maximum core damage frequency of 4 × 10^{−7} per plant per year.

According to the Nuclear Regulatory Commission, 20 states in the USA have requested stocks of potassium iodide which the NRC suggests should be available for those living within 10 miles (16 km) of a nuclear power plant in the unlikely event of a severe accident. Radioactive iodine (radioiodine) is one of the products that can be released in a serious nuclear power plant accident. Potassium iodide (KI) is a non radioactive form of iodine that may be taken to reduce the amount of radioactive iodine absorbed by the body's thyroid gland. When taken before or shortly after a radiological exposure, potassium iodide blocks the thyroid glands ability to absorb radioactive iodine. Potassium iodide should be taken by the public during an emergency only when directed by public health officials.

== Accidents ==
=== Emergency Classifications ===
The NRC established a classification scale for nuclear power plant events to ensure consistency in the communications and emergency response.

- Unusual Event—This is the lowest of the four emergency classifications. This classification indicates that a small problem has occurred. No release of radioactive material is expected and federal, state and county officials are notified.
- Alert—Events are in process or have occurred which involve an actual or potential substantial degradation in the level of safety of the plant. Any releases of radioactive material from the plant are expected to be limited to a small fraction of the Environmental Protection Agency (EPA) Protective Action Guide for Nuclear Incidents (PAGs)
- Site Area Emergency—Involves events in process or which have occurred that result in actual or likely major failures of plant functions needed for protection of the public. Any releases of radioactive material are not expected to exceed the levels established by the EPA PAGs except near the site boundary.
- General Emergency—The most serious emergency classification and indicates a serious problem. A general emergency involves actual or imminent substantial core damage or melting of reactor fuel with the potential for loss of containment integrity. Emergency sirens will be sounded and federal, state and county officials will act to ensure public safety. Radioactive releases during a general emergency can reasonably be expected to exceed the EPA PAGs for more than the immediate site area.

=== Rocky Flats Plant ===
One of four example estimates of the plutonium (Pu-239) plume from the 1957 fire at the Rocky Flats nuclear weapons plant. More info.

The Rocky Flats Plant, a former U.S. nuclear weapons production facility in the state of Colorado, caused radioactive contamination within and outside its boundaries and also produced "area-wide contamination of the Denver area." The contamination resulted from decades of emissions, leaks and fires that released radioactive isotopes, largely plutonium (Pu-239), into the environment. The plant was located about 15 miles upwind from Denver and has since been shut down and its buildings demolished and completely removed from the site. Public protests and a combined Federal Bureau of Investigation (FBI) and United States Environmental Protection Agency (EPA) raid in 1989 stopped production at the Rocky Flats Plant.

As noted in a scientific journal, "Exposures of a large population in the Denver area to plutonium and other radionuclides in the exhaust plumes from the plant date back to 1953." Moreover, in 1957 there was a major Pu-239 fire at the plant, followed by another major fire in 1969. Both of these fires resulted in this radioactive material being released into the atmosphere, with the then-secret 1957 fire being the more serious of the two. The contamination of the Denver area by plutonium from these fires and other sources was not reported until the 1970s, and as of 2011 the U.S. Government continues to withhold data on post-Superfund cleanup contamination levels. Elevated levels of plutonium have been found in the remains of cancer victims living near the Rocky Flats site, and breathable plutonium outside the former boundaries of the plant was found in August 2010.

=== Hanford Site ===
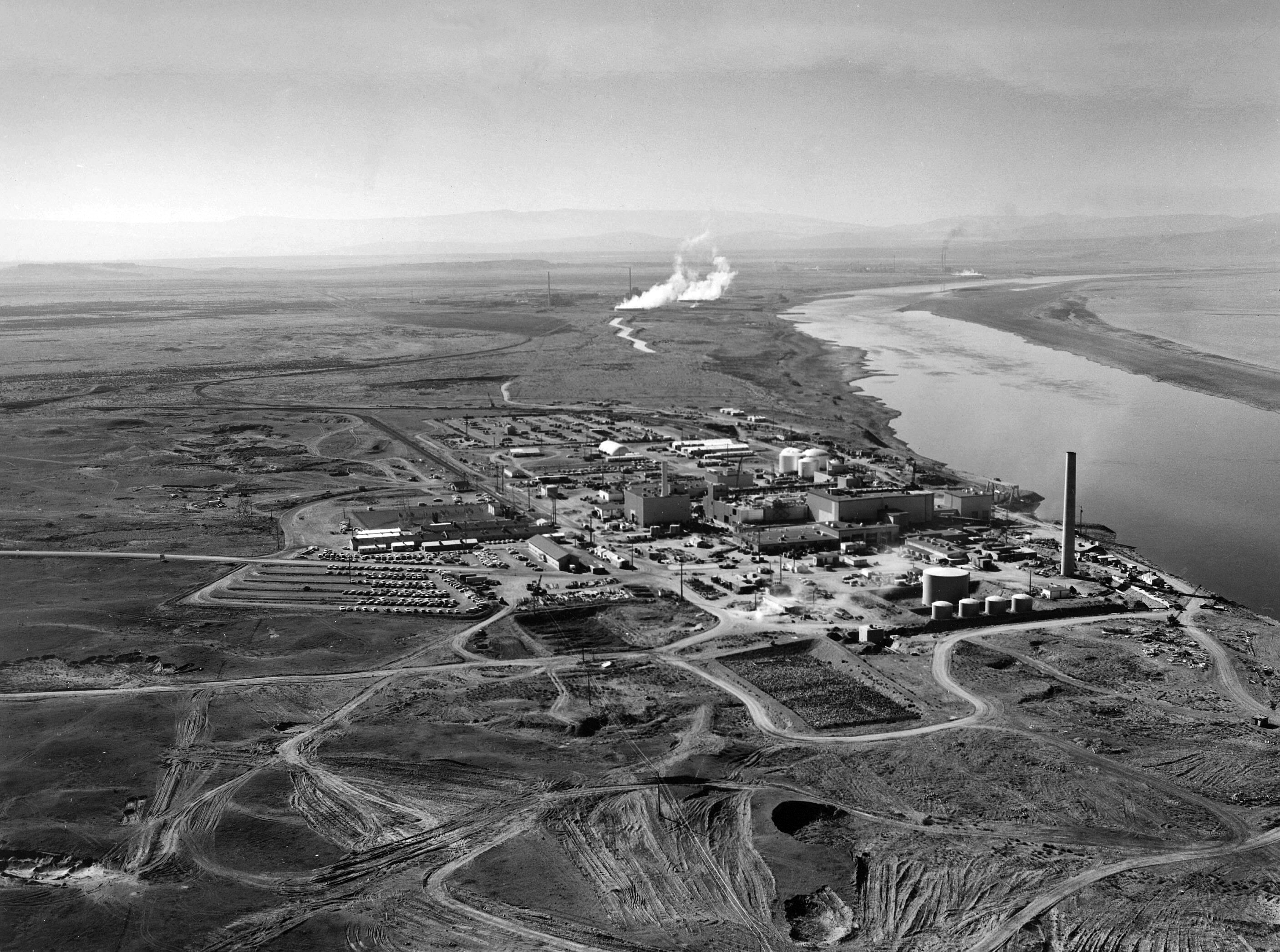
The Hanford site represents two-thirds of America's high-level radioactive waste by volume. Nuclear reactors line the riverbank at the Hanford Site along the Columbia River in January 1960.

The Hanford Site is a mostly decommissioned nuclear production complex on the Columbia River in the U.S. state of Washington, operated by the United States federal government. Plutonium manufactured at the site was used in the first nuclear bomb, tested at the Trinity site, and in Fat Man, the bomb detonated over Nagasaki, Japan. During the Cold War, the project was expanded to include nine nuclear reactors and five large plutonium processing complexes, which produced plutonium for most of the 60,000 weapons in the U.S. nuclear arsenal. Many of the early safety procedures and waste disposal practices were inadequate, and government documents have since confirmed that Hanford's operations released significant amounts of radioactive materials into the air and the Columbia River, which still threatens the health of residents and ecosystems. The weapons production reactors were decommissioned at the end of the Cold War, but the decades of manufacturing left behind 53 million US gallons (200,000 m^{3}) of high-level radioactive waste, an additional 25 million cubic feet (710,000 m^{3}) of solid radioactive waste, 200 square miles (520 km^{2}) of contaminated groundwater beneath the site and occasional discoveries of undocumented contaminations that slow the pace and raise the cost of cleanup. The Hanford site represents two-thirds of the nation's high-level radioactive waste by volume. Today, Hanford is the most contaminated nuclear site in the United States and is the focus of the nation's largest environmental cleanup.

=== SL-1 meltdown ===
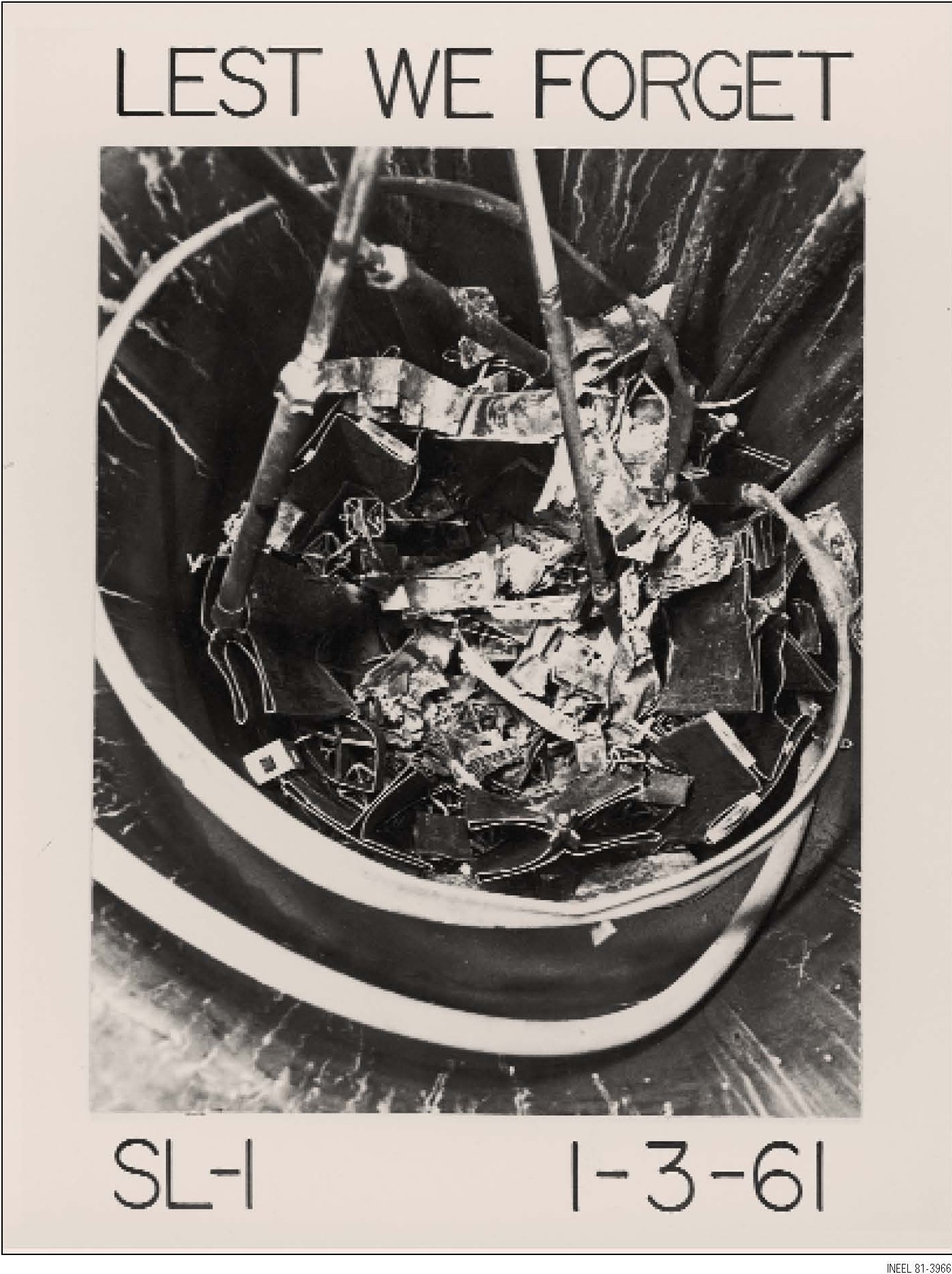
This image of the SL-1 core served as a sober reminder of the damage that a nuclear meltdown can cause.

The SL-1, or Stationary Low-Power Reactor Number One, was a United States Army experimental nuclear power reactor which underwent a steam explosion and meltdown on January 3, 1961, killing its three operators. The direct cause was the improper withdrawal of the central control rod, responsible for absorbing neutrons in the reactor core. The event is the only known fatal reactor accident in the United States. The accident released about 80 curies (3.0 TBq) of iodine-131, which was not considered significant due to its location in a remote desert of Idaho. About 1,100 curies (41 TBq) of fission products were released into the atmosphere.

=== Three Mile Island ===
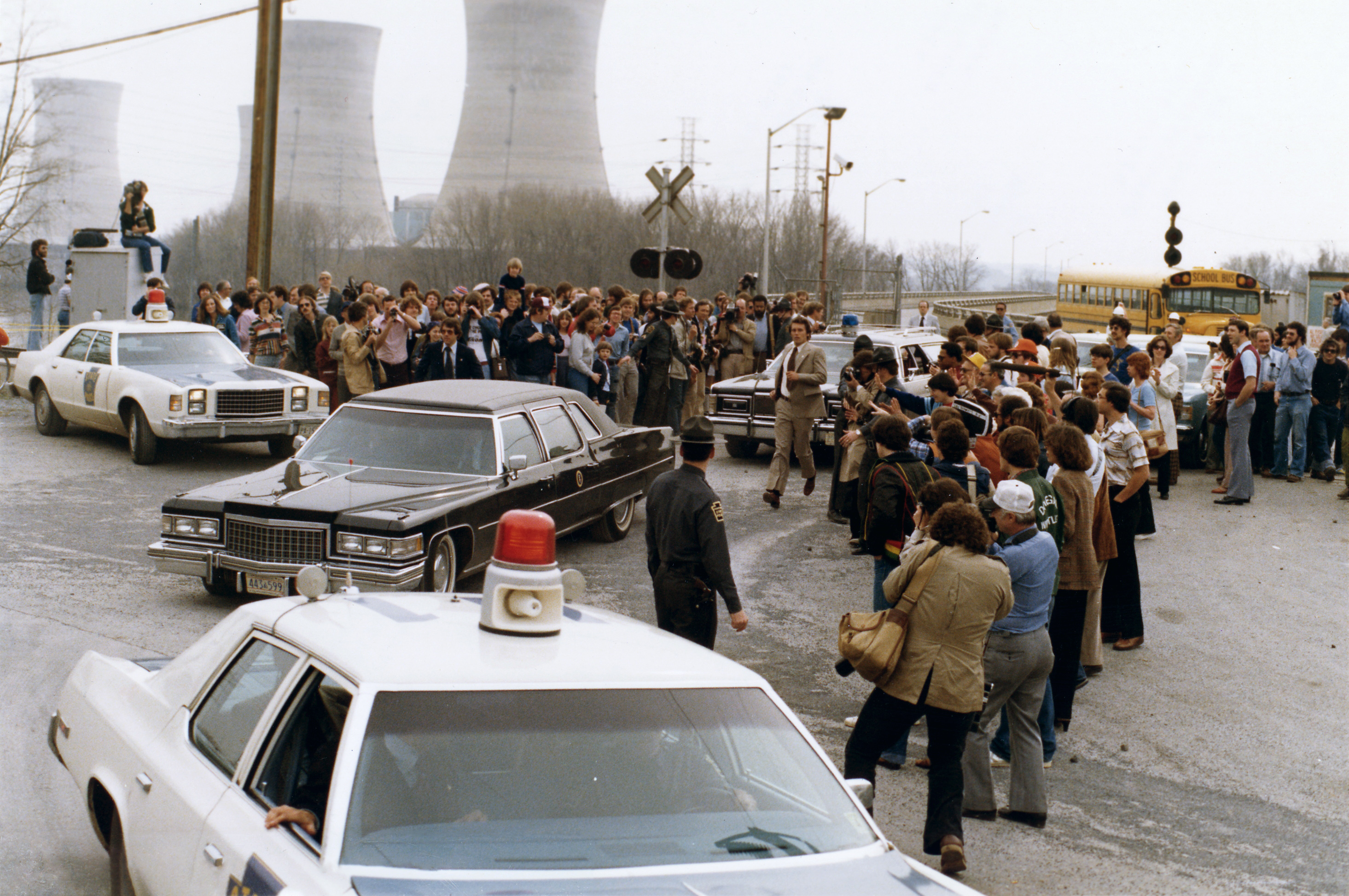
President Jimmy Carter leaving Three Mile Island for Middletown, Pennsylvania, April 1, 1979.

On March 28, 1979, equipment failures and operator error contributed to loss of coolant and a partial core meltdown at the Three Mile Island Nuclear Power Plant in Pennsylvania. The mechanical failures were compounded by the initial failure of plant operators to recognize the situation as a loss-of-coolant accident due to inadequate training and human factors, such as human-computer interaction design oversights relating to ambiguous control room indicators in the power plant's user interface. In particular, a hidden indicator light led to an operator manually overriding the automatic emergency cooling system of the reactor because the operator mistakenly believed that there was too much coolant water present in the reactor and causing the steam pressure release. The scope and complexity of the accident became clear over the course of five days, as employees of Met Ed, Pennsylvania state officials, and members of the U.S. Nuclear Regulatory Commission (NRC) tried to understand the problem, communicate the situation to the press and local community, decide whether the accident required an emergency evacuation, and ultimately end the crisis. The NRC's authorization of the release of 40,000 gallons of radioactive waste water directly in the Susquehanna River led to a loss of credibility with the press and community.

The 1979 Three Mile Island accident inspired Perrow's book Normal Accidents, where a nuclear accident occurs, resulting from an unanticipated interaction of multiple failures in a complex system. TMI was an example of a normal accident because it was "unexpected, incomprehensible, uncontrollable and unavoidable".

Perrow concluded that the failure at Three Mile Island was a consequence of the system's immense complexity. Such modern high-risk systems, he realized, were prone to failures however well they were managed. It was inevitable that they would eventually suffer what he termed a 'normal accident'. Therefore, he suggested, we might do better to contemplate a radical redesign, or if that was not possible, to abandon such technology entirely.

A fundamental issue contributing to a nuclear power system's complexity is its extremely long lifetime. The timeframe from the start of construction of a commercial nuclear power station through the safe disposal of its last radioactive waste, may be 100 to 150 years.

The World Nuclear Association has stated that cleanup of the damaged nuclear reactor system at TMI-2 took nearly 12 years and cost approximately US$973 million. Benjamin K. Sovacool, in his 2007 preliminary assessment of major energy accidents, estimated that the TMI accident caused a total of $2.4 billion in property damages. The health effects of the Three Mile Island accident are widely, but not universally, agreed to be very low level. The accident triggered protests around the world.

=== List of accidents ===
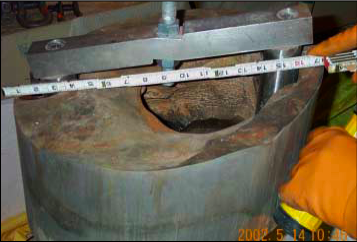
Erosion of the 6-inch-thick (150 mm) carbon steel reactor head at Davis-Besse Nuclear Power Plant in 2002, caused by a persistent leak of borated water.

The United States Government Accountability Office reported more than 150 incidents from 2001 to 2006 alone of nuclear plants not performing within acceptable safety guidelines. In 2006, it said: "Since 2001, the ROP has resulted in more than 4,000 inspection findings concerning nuclear power plant licensees' failure to fully comply with NRC regulations and industry standards for safe plant operation, and NRC has subjected more than 7.5 percent (79) of the 103 operating plants to increased oversight for varying periods". Seventy-one percent of all recorded major nuclear accidents, including meltdowns, explosions, fires, and loss of coolants, occurred in the United States, and they happened during both normal operations as well as emergency situations such as floods, droughts, and earthquakes.

Nuclear power plant accidents in the U.S. with multiple fatalities or more than US$100 million in property damage, 1952-2010
Date	Location	Description	Fatalities	Cost (in millions 2006 $)
January 3, 1961	Idaho Falls, Idaho, US	Criticality Steam Explosion at SL-1 National Reactor Testing Station	3	$US22
March 28, 1979	Middletown, Pennsylvania, US	Loss-of-coolant and partial core meltdown, see Three Mile Island accident and Three Mile Island accident health effects	0	US$2,400
September 15, 1984	Athens, Alabama, US	Safety violations, operator error, and design problems force six year outage at Browns Ferry Unit 2	0	US$110
March 9, 1985	Athens, Alabama, US	Instrumentation systems malfunction during startup, which led to suspension of operations at all three Browns Ferry Units	0	US$1,830
April 11, 1986	Plymouth, Massachusetts, US	Recurring equipment problems force emergency shutdown of Boston Edison's Pilgrim Nuclear Power Plant	0	US$1,001
March 31, 1987	Delta, Pennsylvania, US	Peach Bottom units 2 and 3 shutdown due to cooling malfunctions and unexplained equipment problems	0	US$400
December 19, 1987	Lycoming, New York, US	Malfunctions force Niagara Mohawk Power Corporation to shut down Nine Mile Point Unit 1	0	US$150
March 17, 1989	Lusby, Maryland, US	Inspections at Calvert Cliff Units 1 and 2 reveal cracks at pressurized heater sleeves, forcing extended shutdowns	0	US$120
February 20, 1996	Waterford, Connecticut, US	Leaking valve forces shutdown Millstone Nuclear Power Plant Units 1 and 2, multiple equipment failures found	0	US$254
September 2, 1996	Crystal River, Florida, US	Balance-of-plant equipment malfunction forces shutdown and extensive repairs at Crystal River Unit 3	0	US$384
February 16, 2002	Oak Harbor, Ohio, US	Severe corrosion of reactor head forces 24-month outage of Davis-Besse reactor	0	US$143
February 1, 2010	Vernon, Vermont, US	Deteriorating underground pipes from the Vermont Yankee Nuclear Power Plant leak radioactive tritium into groundwater supplies	0	US$700

=== Chernobyl ===
Experts have disagreed about whether an accident as serious as the Chernobyl disaster could occur in the USA. In 1986, Commissioner Asselstine testified before Congress that:

While we hope that their occurrence is unlikely, there are accident sequences for U.S. plants that can lead to rupture or by-passing of the containment in U.S. reactors which would result in the off-site release of fission products comparable or worse than the releases estimated by the NRC to have taken place during the Chernobyl accident.

=== Fukushima implications ===
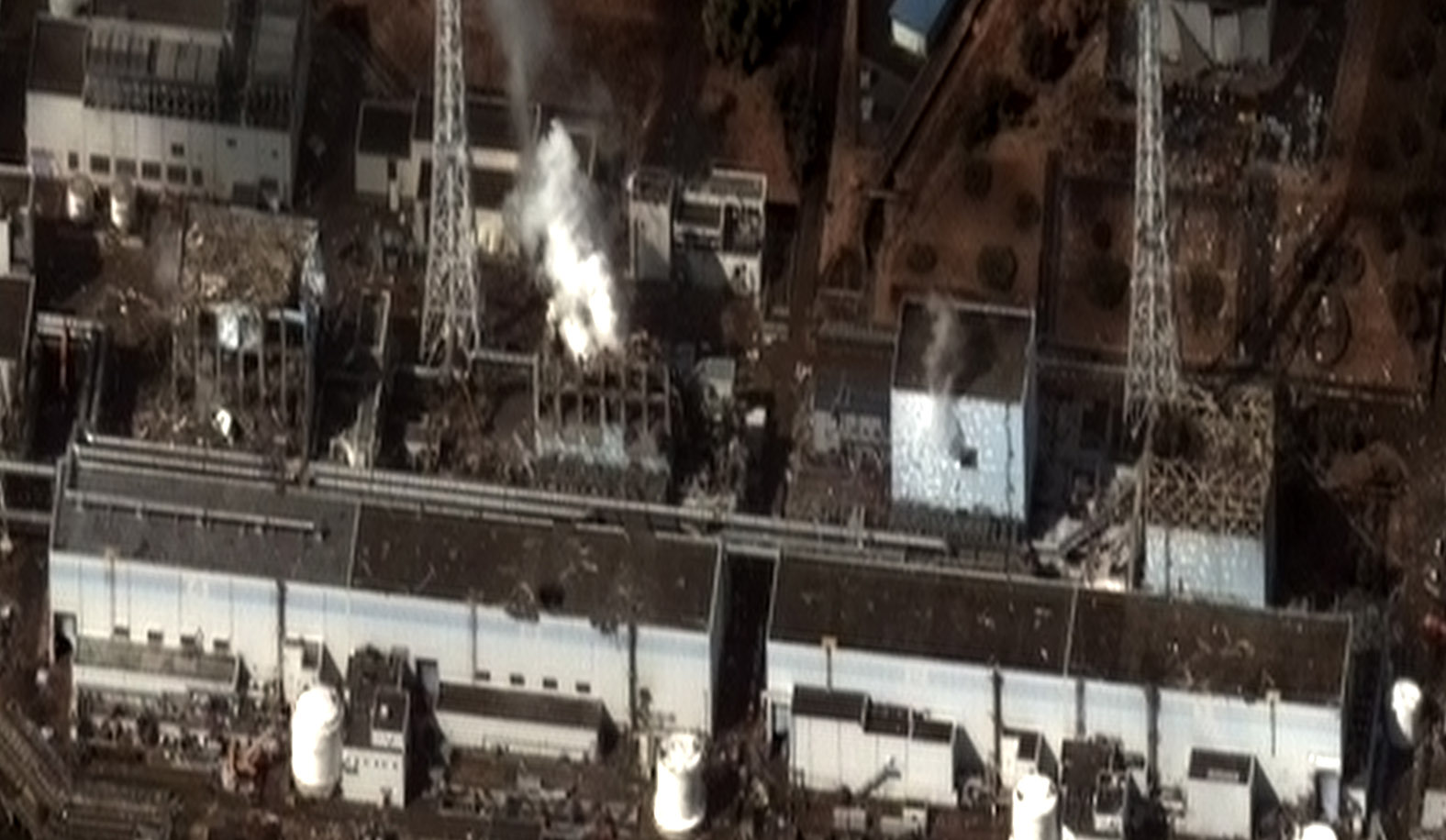
Following the 2011 Japanese Fukushima nuclear disaster, authorities shut down the nation's 54 nuclear power plants. As of 2013, the Fukushima site remains highly radioactive, with some 160,000 evacuees still living in temporary housing, and some land will be unfarmable for centuries. The difficult cleanup job will take 40 or more years, and cost tens of billions of dollars.

Following the Fukushima Daiichi nuclear disaster, according to Black & Veatch's annual utility survey that took place after the disaster, of the 700 executives from the US electric utility industry that were surveyed, nuclear safety was the top concern. There are likely to be increased requirements for on-site spent fuel management and elevated design basis threats at nuclear power plants. License extensions for existing reactors will face additional scrutiny, with outcomes depending on the degree to which plants can meet new requirements, and some of the extensions already granted for more than 60 of the 104 operating U.S. reactors could be revisited. On-site storage, consolidated long-term storage, and geological disposal of spent fuel is "likely to be reevaluated in a new light because of the Fukushima storage pool experience".

In October 2011, the Nuclear Regulatory Commission instructed agency staff to move forward with seven of the 12 safety recommendations put forward by the federal task force in July. The recommendations include "new standards aimed at strengthening operators' ability to deal with a complete loss of power, ensuring plants can withstand floods and earthquakes and improving emergency response capabilities". The new safety standards will take up to five years to fully implement.

On February 9, 2012 Jaczko cast the lone dissenting vote on plans to build the first new nuclear power plant in more than 30 years when the NRC voted 4–1 to allow Atlanta-based Southern Co to build and operate two new nuclear power reactors at its existing Vogtle nuclear power plant in Georgia. He cited safety concerns stemming from Japan's 2011 Fukushima nuclear disaster, saying "I cannot support issuing this license as if Fukushima never happened".

== Recent developments ==
According to senior scientist Edwin Lyman from the UCS, despite the events of September 11, the Nuclear Regulatory Commission (NRC) has voted to delay implementation of safety and security upgrades in ways that will weaken protection of nuclear power plants.

Experience has shown that having a good security plan on paper is no guarantee that it could be implemented in practice. Yet, upgraded NRC-run "force-on-force" security exercises (using a team of mock nuclear terrorists) have been delayed. Also, the schedule for developing new requirements for protecting dry cask spent fuel storage from sabotage has been put back by five years, to the end of 2023.

Lyman says that these new moves illustrate an "ominous trend". Pressure from the nuclear industry to delay tighter security arrangements has succeeded, with the full support of the NRC's commissioners. Commissioners backing of these retrograde measures could be seen as providing industry protection rather than defending the safety of the public.

== See also ==
- Nuclear safety
- Nuclear power
- Nuclear power in the United States
- Institute of Nuclear Power Operations
- Nuclear Power 2010 Program
- List of books about nuclear issues
- Lists of nuclear disasters and radioactive incidents
- Nuclear whistleblowers
- Radiological protection
