= Nuclear reactor accidents in the United States =

Nuclear Reactor and Power Plant Accidents that have occurred in the past years

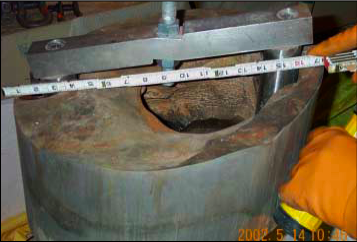
Erosion of the 6-inch-thick (150 mm) carbon steel reactor head, caused by a persistent leak of borated water, at the Davis-Besse Nuclear Power Plant.

The United States Government Accountability Office reported more than 150 incidents from 2001 to 2006 of nuclear plants not performing within acceptable safety guidelines. According to a 2010 survey of energy accidents, there have been at least 56 accidents at nuclear reactors in the United States (defined as incidents that either resulted in the loss of human life or more than US$50,000 of property damage). The most serious of these was the Three Mile Island accident in 1979. Davis-Besse Nuclear Power Plant has been the source of two of the top five most dangerous nuclear incidents in the United States since 1979. Relatively few accidents have involved fatalities.

== Context of nuclear accidents ==
Globally, there have been at least 99 (civilian and military) recorded nuclear reactor accidents from 1952 to 2009 (defined as incidents that either resulted in the loss of human life or more than US$50,000 of property damage, the amount the US federal government uses to define major energy accidents that must be reported), totaling US$20.5 billion in property damages. The accidents involved meltdowns, explosions, fires, and loss of coolant, and occurred during both normal operation and extreme emergency conditions (such as droughts and earthquakes). Property damage costs include destruction of property, emergency response, environmental remediation, evacuation, lost product, fines, and court claims. Because nuclear reactors are large and complex, accidents onsite tend to be relatively expensive.

In the U.S., at least 56 nuclear reactor accidents have occurred. The most serious of these U.S. accidents was the Three Mile Island accident in 1979. According to the Nuclear Regulatory Commission, the Davis–Besse Nuclear Power Station has been the source of two of the top five most dangerous nuclear incidents in the United States since 1979.

The United States Government Accountability Office reported more than 150 incidents from 2001 to 2006 of nuclear plants not performing within acceptable safety guidelines. In 2006, it said: "Since 2001, the ROP has resulted in more than 4,000 inspection findings concerning nuclear power plant licensees' failure to fully comply with NRC regulations and industry standards for safe plant operation, and NRC has subjected more than 75 percent (79) of the 103 operating plants to increased oversight for varying periods".

== History ==
The Atomic Energy Act of 1954 encouraged private corporations in the United States to build nuclear reactors and a significant learning phase followed with many early partial core meltdowns and accidents at experimental reactors and research facilities. This led to the introduction of the Price-Anderson Act in 1957, which was "an implicit admission that nuclear power provided risks that producers were unwilling to assume without federal backing".

Nuclear reactor accidents continued into the 1960s with a small test reactor exploding at the Stationary Low-Power Reactor Number One in Idaho Falls in January 1961 resulting in three deaths which were the first fatalities in the history of U.S. nuclear reactor operations. There was also a partial meltdown at the Enrico Fermi Nuclear Generating Station in Michigan in 1966.

The large size of nuclear reactors ordered during the late 1960s raised new safety questions and created fears of a severe reactor accident that would send large quantities of radiation into the environment. In the early 1970s, a highly contentious debate over the performance of emergency core cooling systems in nuclear plants, designed to prevent a core meltdown that could lead to the "China syndrome", received coverage in the popular media and technical journals.

In 1976, four nuclear engineers —three from GE and one from the Nuclear Regulatory Commission— resigned, stating that nuclear power was not as safe as their superiors were claiming. They testified to the Joint Committee on Atomic Energy that:

"the cumulative effect of all design defects and deficiencies in the design, construction and operations of nuclear power plants makes a nuclear power plant accident, in our opinion, a certain event. The only question is when, and where.

== Three Mile Island Nuclear Plant accident ==
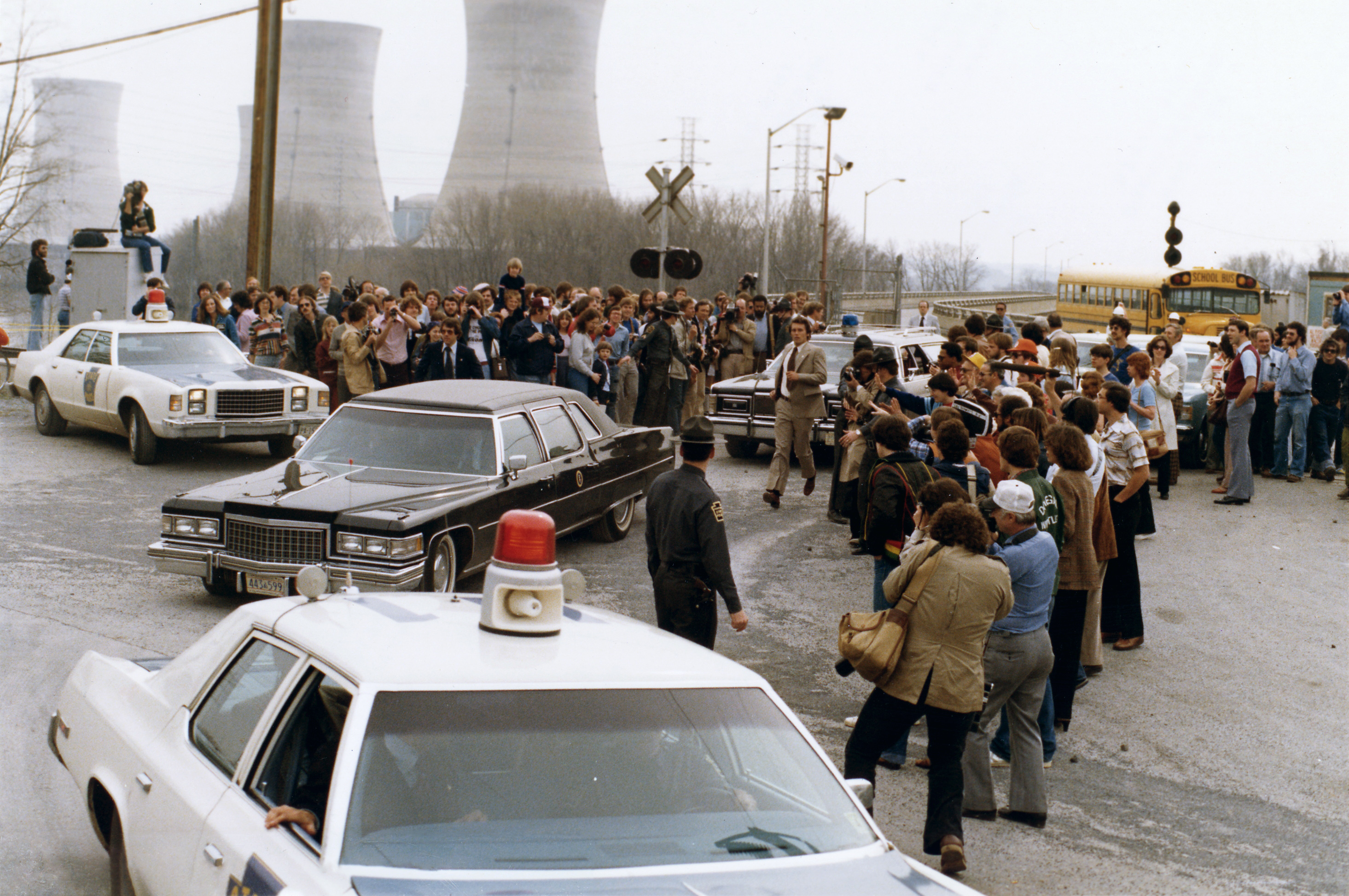
President Jimmy Carter leaving Three Mile Island Nuclear Generating Station for Middletown, Pennsylvania, April 1, 1979

On March 28, 1979, equipment failures and operator error contributed to loss of coolant and a partial core meltdown of Unit 2's pressurized water reactor at the Three Mile Island Nuclear Power Plant in Pennsylvania. The scope and complexity of this reactor accident became clear over the course of five days, as a number of agencies at the local, state and federal levels tried to solve the problem and decide whether the ongoing accident required an emergency evacuation, and to what extent.

Cleanup started in August 1979 and officially ended in December 1993, with a total cleanup cost of about $1 billion. In his 2007 preliminary assessment of major energy accidents, Benjamin K. Sovacool, estimated that the TMI accident caused a total of $2.4 billion in property damages. The health effects of the Three Mile Island accident are widely, but not universally, agreed to be very low level.

The TMI accident forced regulatory and operational improvements on a reluctant industry, but it also increased opposition to nuclear power. The accident triggered protests around the world.

== List of accidents and incidents ==
(also - somewhat differently - including the US)

Nuclear reactor accidents in the U.S.
Date	Location	Description	Fatalities	Cost (in millions 2006 US$)	INES rating
November 29, 1955	Arco, Idaho	Power excursion with partial core meltdown at National Reactor Testing Station's EBR-1 Experimental Breeder Reactor I	0	5	
July 26, 1959	Simi Valley, California	Partial core meltdown at Santa Susana Field Laboratory's Sodium Reactor Experiment	0	32	
January 3, 1961	Idaho Falls, Idaho	Steam explosion and meltdown results in three fatalities at National Reactor Testing Station's SL-1 Stationary Low-Power Reactor Number One	3	22	4
July 24, 1964	Charlestown, Rhode Island	An error by a worker at a United Nuclear Corporation fuel facility led to an accidental criticality	1	?	
October 5, 1966	Monroe, Michigan	Sodium cooling system malfunctions at Enrico Fermi demonstration breeder reactor causing partial core meltdown	0	19	
July 16, 1971	Cordova, Illinois	An electrician is electrocuted by a live cable at the Quad Cities Unit 1 reactor on the Mississippi River	1	1	
April 21, 1973	Pacific Ocean, 370 miles from Puget Sound	Primary coolant leak on board the USS Guardfish while underway	0	?	
August 11, 1973	Covert Township, Michigan	Steam generator leak at the Palisades Nuclear Generating Station causes manual shutdown of pressurized water reactor	0	10	
March 22, 1975	Athens, Alabama	Fire burns for seven hours and damages more than 1600 control cables for three nuclear reactors at Browns Ferry, disabling core cooling systems	0	240	
November 5, 1975 and January 4, 1976	Brownville, Nebraska	Hydrogen gas explosions damage the Cooper Nuclear Facility's auxiliary building	0	13	
June 10, 1977	Waterford, Connecticut	Hydrogen gas explosion damages three buildings and forces shutdown of Millstone-1 Boiling Water Reactor	0	15	
February 4, 1979	Surry, Virginia	Surry Unit 2 shut down in response to failing tube bundles in steam generators	0	12	
March 28, 1979	Middletown, Pennsylvania	Loss of coolant and partial core meltdown, see Three Mile Island accident and Three Mile Island accident health effects	0	2400	5
November 22, 1980	San Clemente, California	Worker cleaning breaker cubicles at San Onofre Pressurized Water Reactor contacts an energized line and is electrocuted	1	1	
January 25, 1982	Ontario, New York	Ginna Nuclear Generating Station (then operated by Rochester Gas & Electric now by Constellation Energy Nuclear Group) experiences a steam tube rupture, releasing radioactivity into the environment.	0	1	
February 26, 1982	San Clemente, California	Southern California Company shuts down San Onofre Unit 1 out of concerns about earthquake	0	1	
March 20, 1982	Scriba, New York	Recirculation system piping fails at Nine Mile Point Unit 1, forcing two year shutdown	0	45	
March 25, 1982	Buchanan, New York	Damage to steam generator tubes and main generator resulting in a shut down Indian Point Energy Center Unit 3 for more than a year	0	56	
June 18, 1982	Seneca, South Carolina	Feedwater heat extraction line fails at Oconee 2 Pressurised Water Reactor, damaging thermal cooling system	0	10	
February 12, 1983	Forked River, New Jersey	Oyster Creek Nuclear Generating Station fails safety inspection, forced to shut down for repairs	0	32	
February 26, 1983	Fort Pierce, Florida	Damaged thermal shield and core barrel support at St. Lucie Unit 1, necessitating 13-month shutdown	0	54	
September 15, 1984	Athens, Alabama	Safety violations, operator error, and design problems force six year outage at Browns Ferry Unit 2	0	110	
March 9, 1985	Athens, Alabama	Instrumentation systems malfunction during start-up, which led to suspension of operations at all three Browns Ferry Units	0	1830	
June 9, 1985	Oak Harbor, Ohio	Loss of feedwater event at Davis-Besse reactor after main pumps shut down and auxiliary pumps tripped due to operator error. NRC review determines site area emergency should have been declared	0	?	
April 11, 1986	Plymouth, Massachusetts	Reocurring equipment problems force emergency shutdown of Boston Edison's Pilgrim Nuclear Power Plant	0	1001	
December 9, 1986	Surry, Virginia	Feedwater line-burst at Surry Nuclear Power Plant kills 4	4	?	
March 31, 1987	Delta, Pennsylvania	Peach Bottom units 2 and 3 shutdown due to cooling malfunctions and unexplained equipment problems	0	400	
July 15, 1987	Burlington, Kansas	Safety inspector dies from electrocution after contacting a mislabeled wire at Wolf Creek Nuclear Generating Station	1	1	
December 19, 1987	Scriba, New York	Malfunctions force Niagara Mohawk Power Corporation to shut down Nine Mile Point Unit 1	0	150	
March 29, 1988	Burlington, Kansas	A worker at the Wolf Creek Generating Station falls through an unmarked manhole and electrocutes himself when trying to escape	1	1	
September 10, 1988	Surry, Virginia	Refuelling cavity seal fails and destroys internal pipe system at Surry Unit 2, forcing 12-month outage	0	9	
March 5, 1989	Tonopah, Arizona	Atmospheric dump valves fail at Palo Verde Unit 1, leading to main transformer fire and emergency shutdown	0	14	
March 17, 1989	Lusby, Maryland	Inspections at Calvert Cliff Units 1 and 2 reveal cracks at pressurized heater sleeves, forcing extended shutdowns	0	120	
November 17, 1991	Scriba, New York	Safety and fire problems force shut down of the FitzPatrick nuclear reactor for 13 months	0	5	
April 21, 1992	Southport, North Carolina	NRC forces shut down of Brunswick Units 1 and 2 after emergency diesel generators fail	0	2	
February 3, 1993	Bay City, Texas	Auxiliary feed-water pumps fail at South Texas Project Units 1 and 2, prompting rapid shutdown of both reactors	0	3	
February 27, 1993	Buchanan, New York	New York Power Authority shuts down Indian Point Energy Center Unit 3 after AMSAC system fails	0	2	
March 2, 1993	Soddy-Daisy, Tennessee	Equipment failures and broken pipes cause shut down of Sequoyah Unit 1	0	3	
December 25, 1993	Newport, Michigan	Shut down of Fermi Unit 2 after main turbine experienced major failure due to improper maintenance	0	67	
14 January 1995	Wiscasset, Maine	Steam generator tubes unexpectedly crack at Maine Yankee nuclear reactor; shut down of the facility for a year	0	62	
May 16, 1995	Salem, New Jersey	Ventilation systems fail at Salem Units 1 and 2	0	34	
February 20, 1996	Waterford, Connecticut	Leaking valve forces shutdown Millstone Nuclear Power Plant Units 1 and 2, multiple equipment failures found	0	254	
May 15, 1996	Morris, Illinois	Plunging water levels around the nuclear fuel in the reactor's core prompt shut down at Dresden Generating Station	0	?	
September 2, 1996	Crystal River, Florida	Balance-of-plant equipment malfunction forces shutdown and extensive repairs at Crystal River Unit 3	0	384	
September 5, 1996	Clinton, Illinois	Reactor recirculation pump fails, prompting shut down of Clinton boiling water reactor	0	38	
September 20, 1996	Seneca, Illinois	Service water system fails and results in closure of LaSalle Units 1 and 2 for more than 2 years	0	71	
September 9, 1997	Bridgman, Michigan	Ice condenser containment systems fail at Cook Units 1 and 2	0	11	
May 25, 1999	Waterford, Connecticut	Steam leak in feed-water heater causes manual shutdown and damage to control board annunicator at the Millstone Nuclear Power Plant	0	7	
September 29, 1999	Lower Alloways Creek Township, New Jersey	Major Freon leak at Hope Creek Nuclear Generating Station causes ventilation train chiller to trip, releasing toxic gas and damaging the cooling system	0	2	
February 15, 2000	Buchanan, New York	NRC Alert issued after steam generator tube rupture at Indian Point Unit 2	0	2	
February 16, 2002	Oak Harbor, Ohio	Severe boric acid corrosion of reactor head forces 24-month outage of Davis-Besse reactor	0	605	3
January 15, 2003	Bridgman, Michigan	A fault in the main transformer at the Donald C. Cook Nuclear Generating Station causes a fire that damages the main generator and back-up turbines	0	10	
June 16, 2005	Braidwood, Illinois	Exelon's Braidwood nuclear station leaks tritium and contaminates local water supplies	0	41	
August 4, 2005	Buchanan, New York	Entergy's Indian Point Nuclear Plant leaks tritium and strontium into underground lakes from 1974 to 2005		30	
March 6, 2006	Erwin, Tennessee	Nuclear Fuel Services plant spills 35 litres of highly enriched uranium, necessitating 7-month shutdown	0	98	
September, 2009	Crystal River, Florida	When cutting into Crystal River 3 Nuclear Power Plant containment building to create a large opening for the replacement of the Steam generator (nuclear power) the structure was severely cracked resulting in the permanent closure of the facility.	0	1000+	
February 1, 2010	Vernon, Vermont	Deteriorating underground pipes from the Vermont Yankee Nuclear Power Plant leak radioactive tritium into groundwater supplies	0	700	
July 15, 2011	Morris, Illinois	Chemical leak of sodium hypochlorite restricted access to a vital area that houses plant cooling water pumps at Dresden Generating Station	0	?	
January 30, 2012	Byron, Illinois	An Unusual Incident, the lowest of four NRC emergency status declarations, occurred. Loss of off-site power caused unit 2 to run a shut down cycle and release a safe, expected amount of tritium steam into the atmosphere.	0	?	
March 31, 2013	Russellville, Arkansas	One worker was killed and two others injured when part of a generator fell as it was being moved at the Arkansas Nuclear One.	1	?	
July 2016	Bridgman, Michigan	Heavy steam leak into the turbine building of D.C. Cook Nuclear Station	0	?	
July 2018	Genoa, Wisconsin	La Crosse Boiling Water Reactor Deconstruction leak into Mississippi River	0	?	
November 2022	Wright County, Minnesota	Monticello Nuclear Generating Plant accident: Over 1,500 cubic meters of radioactive water leaked.	0	?	
January-April 2024	Louisa County, Virginia	One of two Emergency diesel generators of North Anna Nuclear Generating Station Unit 2 inoperable during four months because of human error.	0	?	

== Nuclear Power Plant Safety ==
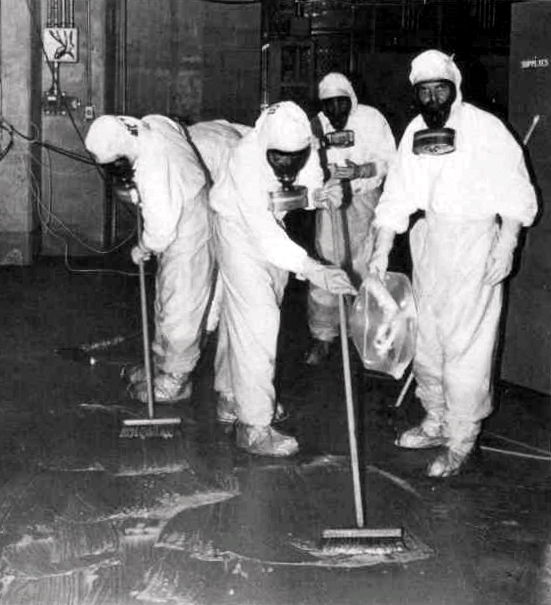
A clean-up crew working to remove radioactive contamination after the Three Mile Island accident.

Nuclear safety in the U.S. is governed by federal regulations issued by the Nuclear Regulatory Commission (NRC). The NRC regulates all nuclear plants and materials in the U.S. except for of nuclear plants and materials controlled by the U.S. government, as well those powering naval vessels.

The 1979 Three Mile Island accident was a pivotal event that led to questions about U.S. nuclear safety. Earlier events had a similar effect, including a 1975 fire at Browns Ferry, the 1976 testimonials of three concerned GE nuclear engineers, the GE Three. In 1981, workers inadvertently reversed pipe restraints at the Diablo Canyon Power Plant reactors, compromising seismic protection systems, which further undermined confidence in nuclear safety. All of these well-publicised events undermined public support for the U.S. nuclear industry in the 1970s and the 1980s.

Recent concerns have been expressed about the safety of nuclear reactors. In 2012, the Union of Concerned Scientists, which tracks ongoing safety issues at operating nuclear plants, found that "leakage of radioactive materials is a pervasive problem at almost 90 percent of all reactors, as are issues that pose a risk of nuclear accidents".

Following the Japanese Fukushima Daiichi nuclear disaster, according to Black & Veatch's annual utility survey that took place after the disaster, of the 700 executives from the US electric utility industry that were surveyed, nuclear safety was the top concern. There are likely to be increased requirements for on-site spent fuel management and elevated design basis threats at nuclear power plants. License extensions for existing reactors will face additional scrutiny, with outcomes depending on the degree to which plants can meet new requirements, and some of the extensions already granted for more than 60 of the 104 operating U.S. reactors could be revisited. On-site storage, consolidated long-term storage, and geological disposal of spent fuel is "likely to be reevaluated in a new light because of the Fukushima storage pool experience".

In October 2011, the Nuclear Regulatory Commission instructed agency staff to move forward with seven of the 12 safety recommendations put forward by the federal task force in July. The recommendations include "new standards aimed at strengthening operators' ability to deal with a complete loss of power, ensuring plants can withstand floods and earthquakes and improving emergency response capabilities". The new safety standards will take up to five years to fully implement.

== See also ==
- Nuclear power accidents by country
- Nuclear and radiation accidents by country
- Lists of nuclear disasters and radioactive incidents
- List of canceled nuclear plants in the United States
- Nuclear safety
