= Nuclear power in the United States =

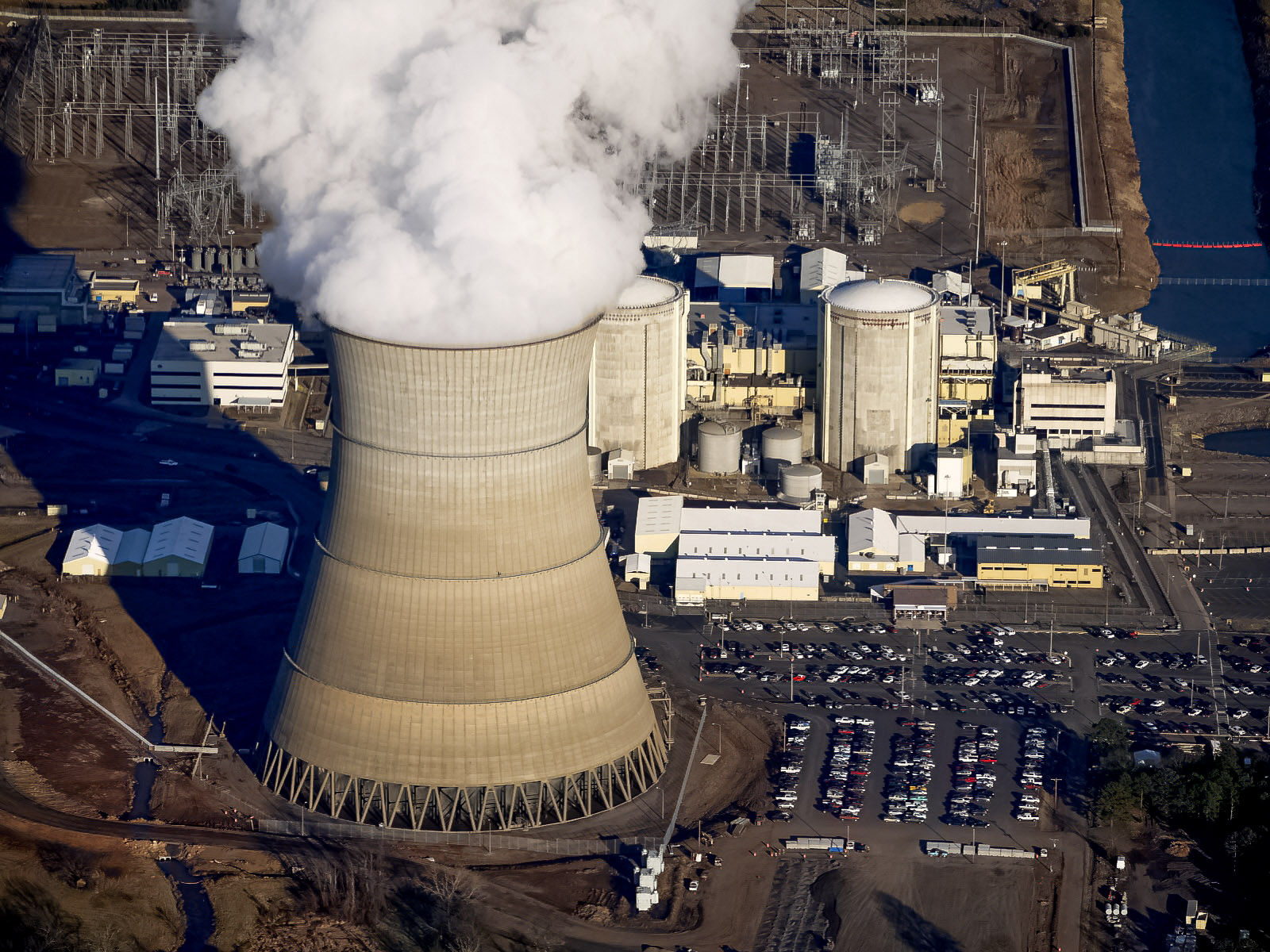
The Arkansas Nuclear One power plant in Russellville, Arkansas

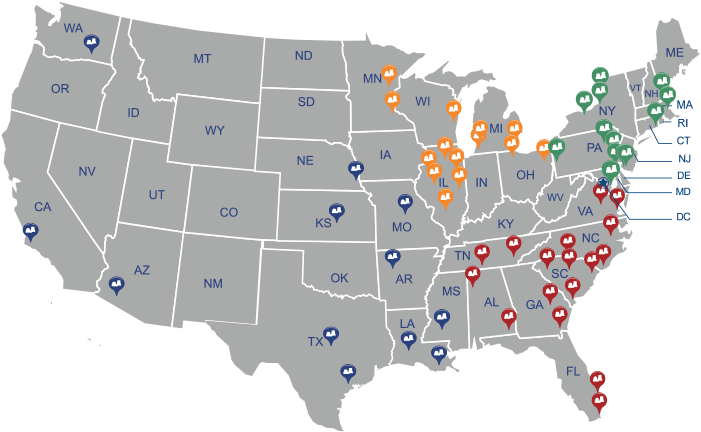
Nuclear reactors within the contiguous United States as of October 2021; marker colors indicate respective administrative regions of the Nuclear Regulatory Commission

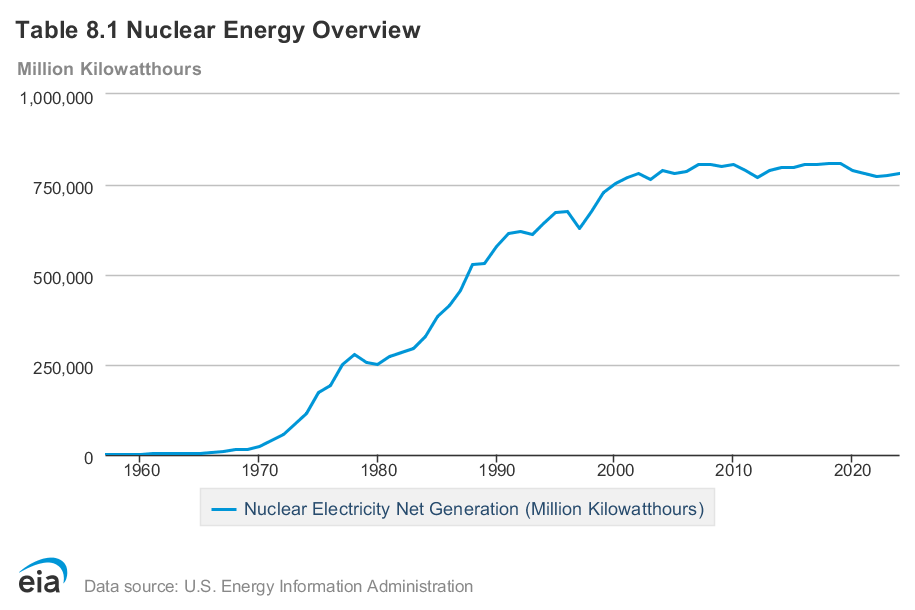
Net electrical generation from US nuclear power plants 1957–2024

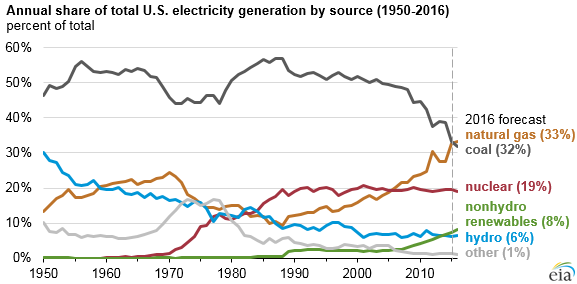
Nuclear power compared to other sources of electricity in the US, 1949–2011

In the United States, nuclear power is provided by 96 commercial reactors with a net capacity of 98 gigawatts (GW), with 65 pressurized water reactors and 31 boiling water reactors. In 2022, they produced a total of 771.5 terawatt-hours of electricity, and by 2024 nuclear energy accounted for 18.6% of the nation's total electric energy generation. In 2018, nuclear comprised nearly 50 percent of US emission-free energy generation.

As of July 2026, 41 reactors have been permanently shut down. The United States is the world's largest producer of commercial nuclear power, and in 2013 generated 33% of the world's nuclear electricity. With the past and future scheduled plant closings, China and Russia could surpass the United States in nuclear energy production.

As of January 2022, the U.S. Nuclear Regulatory Commission (NRC) had granted license renewals to a total of 94 commercial reactors. In early 2014, the NRC prepared to receive the first applications of license renewal beyond 60 years of reactor life as early as 2017, a process which by law requires public involvement. Licenses for 22 reactors are due to expire before the end of 2029 if no renewals are granted. Pilgrim Nuclear Power Station in Massachusetts was permanently shut down on May 31, 2019. Another five aging reactors were permanently closed in 2013 and 2014 before their licenses expired because of high maintenance and repair costs at a time when natural gas prices had fallen: San Onofre 2 and 3 in California, Crystal River 3 in Florida, Vermont Yankee in Vermont, and Kewaunee in Wisconsin. In April 2021, New York State permanently closed Indian Point in Buchanan, 30 miles (48 km) from New York City.

Most reactors began construction by 1974. But after the Three Mile Island accident in 1979 and changing economics, many planned projects were canceled. More than 100 orders for nuclear power reactors, many already under construction, were canceled in the 1970s and 1980s, bankrupting some companies.

In 2006, the Brookings Institution, a public policy organization, stated that new nuclear units had not been built in the United States because of soft demand for electricity, the potential cost overruns on nuclear reactors due to regulatory issues and resulting construction delays.

There was a revival of interest in nuclear power in the 2000s, with talk of a "nuclear renaissance", supported particularly by the Nuclear Power 2010 Program. A number of applications were made, but facing economic challenges, and later in the wake of the 2011 Fukushima Daiichi nuclear disaster, most of these projects have been canceled. Up until 2013, there had also been no ground-breaking on new nuclear reactors at existing power plants since 1977. On October 19, 2016, Tennessee Valley Authority's Unit 2 reactor at the Watts Bar Nuclear Generating Station became the first US reactor to enter commercial operation since 1996. Then in 2012, the Nuclear Regulatory Commission approved construction of four new reactors at existing nuclear plants. Construction of the Virgil C. Summer Nuclear Generating Station Units 2 and 3 began on March 9, 2013, but was abandoned on July 31, 2017, after the reactor supplier Westinghouse filed for bankruptcy protection in March 2017. On March 12, 2013, construction began on the Vogtle Electric Generating Plant Units 3 and 4. The target in-service date for Unit 3 was originally November 2021. Vogtle Unit 3 reached "initial criticality" and started service on July 31, 2023, while Unit 4 entered commercial operation in 2024. These were the first new US commercial reactors to enter operation in more than five years, with a combined gross electrical capacity of 2,500 MW. In 2025, nuclear power produced 18% of the country’s electricity.

== History ==
=== Emergence ===
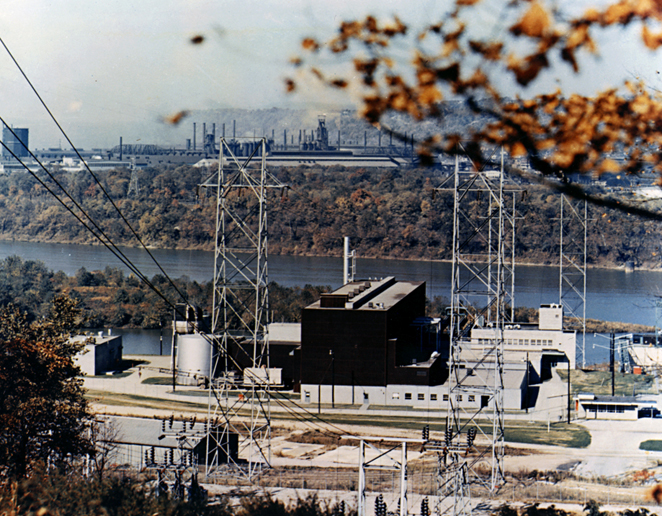
The Shippingport reactor was the first full-scale PWR nuclear power plant in the United States.

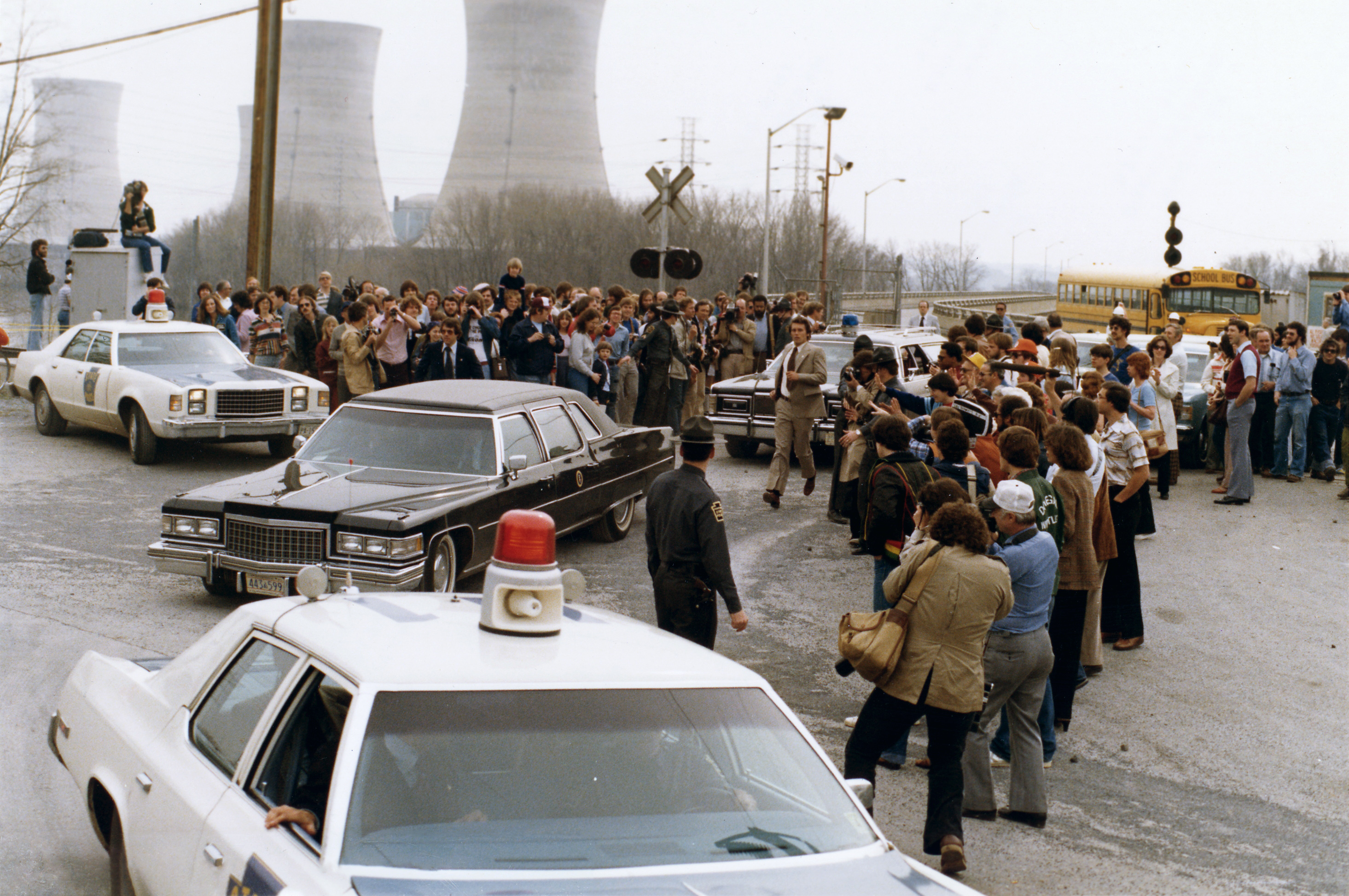
President Jimmy Carter leaving Three Mile Island Nuclear Generating Station for Middletown, Pennsylvania, April 1, 1979

Research into the peaceful uses of nuclear materials began in the United States under the auspices of the Atomic Energy Commission, created by the United States Atomic Energy Act of 1946. Medical scientists were interested in the effect of radiation upon the fast-growing cells of cancer, and materials were given to them, while the military services led research into other peaceful uses.

=== Power reactor research ===
Argonne National Laboratory was assigned by the United States Atomic Energy Commission (AEC) the lead role in developing commercial nuclear energy beginning in the 1940s. Between then and the turn of the 21st century, Argonne designed, built, and operated fourteen reactors at its site southwest of Chicago, and another fourteen reactors at the National Reactor Testing Station (now Idaho National Laboratory) in Idaho. These reactors included initial experiments and test reactors that were the progenitors of today's pressurized water reactor (including United States naval reactors), boiling water reactor, heavy-water reactor, graphite-moderated reactor, and liquid metal cooled reactor, including the EBR-1, the first reactor in the world to generate electricity. Argonne and a number of other AEC contractors built a total of 52 reactors at the National Reactor Testing Station. Two were never operated; except for the Neutron Radiography Facility, all the other reactors were shut down by 2000.

In the early afternoon of December 20, 1951, Argonne director Walter Zinn and fifteen other Argonne staff members witnessed a row of four light bulbs light up in a nondescript brick building in the eastern Idaho desert. Electricity from a generator connected to Experimental Breeder Reactor I (EBR-I) flowed through them. This was the first time that a usable amount of electrical power had ever been generated from nuclear fission. Only days afterward, the reactor produced all the electricity needed for the entire EBR complex. One ton of natural uranium can produce more than 40 gigawatt-hours of electricity—the equivalent to burning 16,000 tons of coal or 80,000 barrels of oil. More central to EBR-I's purpose than just generating electricity, however, was its role in proving that a breeder reactor could create more nuclear fuel as a byproduct than it consumed during operation. In 1953, tests verified that this was the case.

The United States Navy took leadership early in the development of nuclear power in the US, seeing the opportunity to design ships that could steam around the world at high speeds for several decades without needing to refuel, and the possibility of turning submarines into true full-time underwater vehicles. The Navy assigned then-Captain Hyman Rickover, known for his talents in electrical engineering and propulsion systems in addition to project management, to the AEC to start the Naval Reactors project. Rickover's work with the AEC led to the development of the Pressurized Water Reactor (PWR), the first naval model of which was installed in the submarine USS Nautilus, and Rickover became known as the "Father of the Nuclear Navy." A nuclear power plant made the boat capable of operating underwater full-time, which it demonstrated by becoming the first vessel to traverse the North Pole by charting a route underneath the Polar ice cap in August 1958.

Another type of reactor called the Molten-Salt Reactor Experiment was developed at Oak Ridge National Laboratory by Alvin Weinberg in the 1960s. The reactor logged more than 13,000 hours at full power during its brief run from 1965 to 1969, and was able to be shut down and restarted. It achieved all of its objectives, demonstrating the first fission of Uranium-233 for power generation and the feasibility of liquid reactor fuel, as well as greater safety and more efficient fission processes producing less long-lived actinide waste. The molten salt program ended in 1973, with the Atomic Energy Commission deciding to focus on other designs per direction from President Richard Nixon. Both government and industry experts are now reevaluating molten salt technology as an answer to the global energy challenge because it offers modular construction opportunities, produces less long-lived waste, and does not pose the core meltdown or hydrogen explosion risks inherent to water-cooled designs.

=== Start of commercial nuclear power ===
From the successful naval reactor program, plans were quickly developed for the use of reactors to generate steam to drive turbines turning generators. In April 1957, the SM-1 Nuclear Reactor in Fort Belvoir, Virginia was the first atomic power generator to go online and produce electrical energy to the U.S. power grid. On May 26, 1958, the first commercial nuclear power plant in the United States, Shippingport Atomic Power Station, was opened by President Dwight D. Eisenhower as part of his Atoms for Peace program. As nuclear power continued to grow throughout the 1960s, the Atomic Energy Commission (AEC) anticipated that more than 1,000 reactors would be operating in the United States by 2000. As the industry continued to expand, the AEC's development and regulatory functions were separated in 1974; the Department of Energy absorbed research and development, while the regulatory branch was spun off and turned into an independent commission known as the U.S. Nuclear Regulatory Commission (USNRC or simply NRC).

=== Pro-nuclear power stance ===
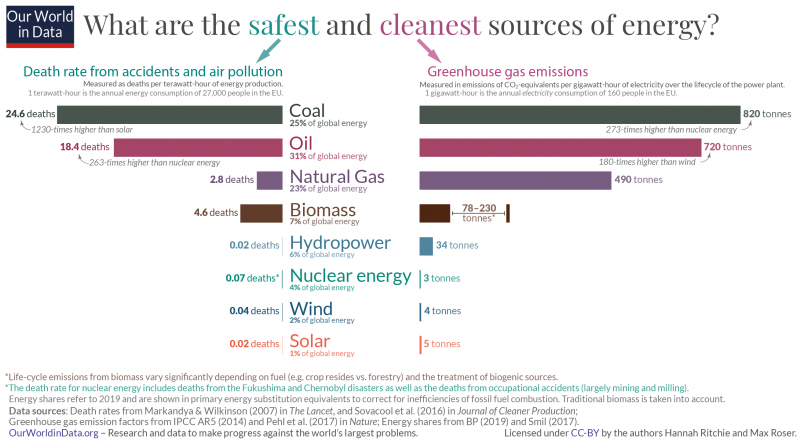
Safest forms of energy

As of February 2020, Our World In Data stated that "nuclear energy and renewables are far, far safer than fossil fuels as regards human health, safety and carbon footprint," with nuclear energy resulting in 99.8% fewer deaths than brown coal; 99.7% fewer than coal; 99.6% fewer than oil; and 97.5% fewer than gas.

Under President Obama, the Office of Nuclear Energy stated in January 2012 that "Nuclear power has safely, reliably, and economically contributed almost 20% of electrical generation in the United States over the past two decades. It remains the single largest contributor (more than 70%) of non-greenhouse-gas-emitting electric power generation in the United States. Domestic demand for electrical energy is expected to grow by more than 30% from 2009 to 2035. At the same time, most of the currently operating nuclear power plants will begin reaching the end of their initial 20-year extension to their original 40-year operating license, for a total of 60 years of operation." It warned that if new plants do not replace those which are retired then the total fraction of generated electrical energy from nuclear power will begin to decline.

The United States Department of Energy web site states that "nuclear power is the most reliable energy source", and to a great degree "has the highest capacity factor. Natural gas and coal capacity factors are generally lower due to routine maintenance and/or refueling at these facilities while renewable plants are considered intermittent or variable sources and are mostly limited by a lack of fuel (i.e. wind, sun, or water)." Nuclear is the largest source of clean power in the United States, generating more than 800 billion kilowatt-hours of electricity each year and producing more than half of the nation's emissions-free electricity. This avoids more than 470 million metric tons of carbon each year, which is the equivalent of removing 100 million cars off of the road. In 2019, nuclear plants operated at full power more than 93% of the time, making it the most reliable energy source on the power grid. The Department of Energy and its national labs are working with industry to develop new reactors and fuels that will increase the overall performance of nuclear technologies and reduce the amount of nuclear waste that is produced.

Advanced nuclear reactors "that are smaller, safer, and more efficient at half the construction cost of today's reactors" were part of Joe Biden's clean energy proposals when he was candidate for U.S. President prior to 2021.

=== Opposition to nuclear power ===
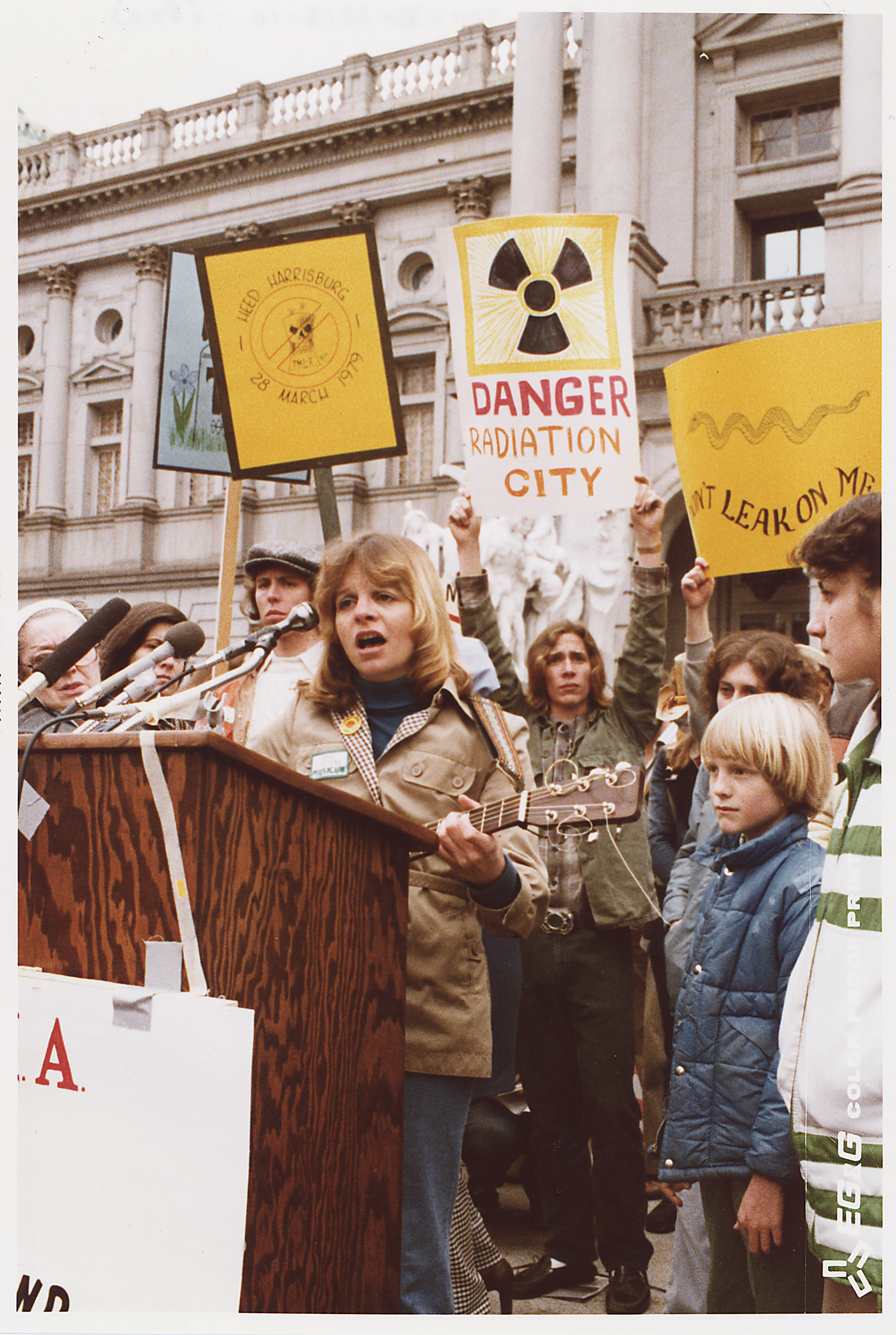
Anti-nuclear protest at Harrisburg in 1979, following the Three Mile Island accident

There has been considerable opposition to the use of nuclear power in the United States. The first U.S. reactor to face public opposition was Enrico Fermi Nuclear Generating Station in 1957. It was built approximately 30 miles from Detroit, Michigan and there was opposition from the United Auto Workers Union. Pacific Gas & Electric planned to build the first commercially viable nuclear power plant in the US at Bodega Bay, north of San Francisco, California. The proposal was controversial and conflict with local citizens began in 1958. The conflict ended in 1964, with the forced abandonment of plans for the power plant. Historian Thomas Wellock traces the birth of the anti-nuclear movement to the controversy over Bodega Bay. Attempts to build a nuclear power plant in Malibu, California were similar to those at Bodega Bay and were also abandoned.

Nuclear accidents continued into the 1960s with a small test reactor exploding at the Stationary Low-Power Reactor Number One in Idaho Falls in January 1961 and a partial meltdown at the Enrico Fermi Nuclear Generating Station in Michigan in 1966. In his 1963 book Change, Hope and the Bomb, David Lilienthal criticized nuclear developments, particularly the nuclear industry's failure to address the nuclear waste question. J. Samuel Walker, in his book Three Mile Island: A Nuclear Crisis in Historical Perspective, explained that the growth of the nuclear industry in the U.S. occurred in the 1970s as the environmental movement was being formed. Environmentalists saw the advantages of nuclear power in reducing air pollution, but were critical of nuclear technology on other grounds. They were concerned about nuclear accidents, nuclear proliferation, high cost of nuclear power plants, nuclear terrorism and radioactive waste disposal.

There were many anti-nuclear protests in the United States which captured national public attention during the 1970s and 1980s. These included the well-known Clamshell Alliance protests at Seabrook Station Nuclear Power Plant and the Abalone Alliance protests at Diablo Canyon Nuclear Power Plant in California, where thousands of protesters were arrested. Other large protests followed the 1979 Three Mile Island accident.

In New York City on September 23, 1979, almost 200,000 people attended a protest against nuclear power. Anti-nuclear power protests preceded the shutdown of the Shoreham, Yankee Rowe, Rancho Seco, Maine Yankee, and about a dozen other nuclear power plants.

=== Historical use of Native land in nuclear energy ===
Nuclear Energy in the United States has greatly affected Native Americans due to the large amount of mining for uranium, and disposal of nuclear waste done on Native lands over the past century. Environmental Sociologists Chad L. Smith and Gregory Hooks have deemed these areas and tribal lands as a whole "sacrifice zones", due to the prevalence of mishandled nuclear materials. Uranium as a resource has largely been located in the southwestern US, and large amounts have been found on Native lands, with the estimates between 25% and 65% of Uranium being located on Native land. Due to this, many mines were placed on Native land and were abandoned without proper closing of these mines. Some of these mines have led to large amounts of pollution on Native land which has contaminated the water and ground. This has led to a large uptick in cancer cases. On the Navajo reservation in particular, there have been three separate cleanup efforts by the EPA, all unsuccessful.

Nuclear waste has been an issue that Native Americans have had to deal with for decades ranging from improper disposal of waste during active mining to the government trying and succeeding to place waste disposal sites on various native lands. In 1986, the US government tried to put a permanent nuclear waste repository on the White Earth Reservation, but the Anishinaabe people who lived there commissioned the Minnesota legislature to prevent it, which worked. However, because there was no permanent place found, the government placed a temporary facility on Yucca Mountain to contain the waste. Yucca Mountain is also on Native Land and is considered a sacred site that the government did not have consent on which to place nuclear waste. Yucca Mountain houses this temporary facility to this day and is being debated over if it should become a permanent facility.

=== Over-commitment and cancellations ===
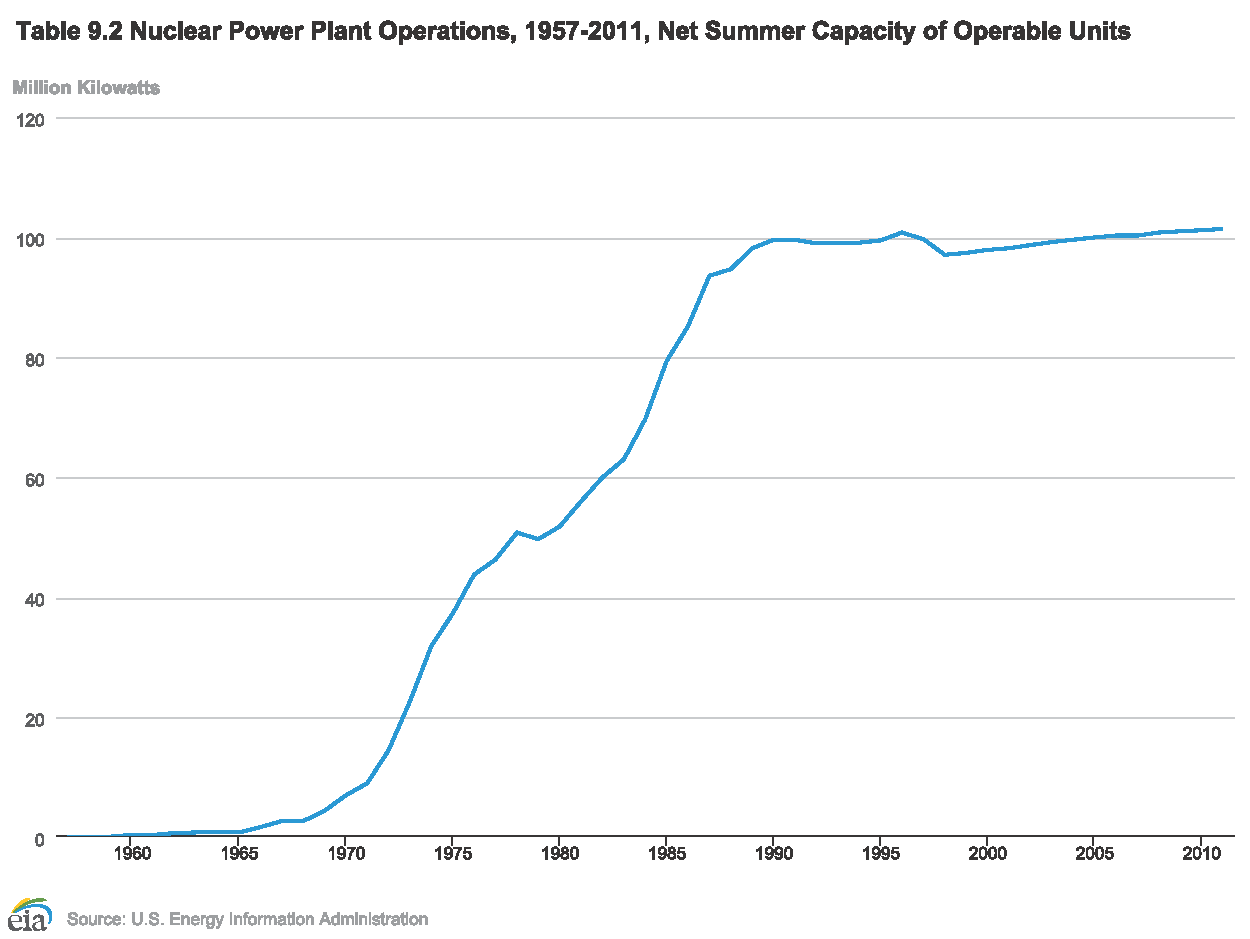
Net summer electrical generation capacity of US nuclear power plants, 1949–2011

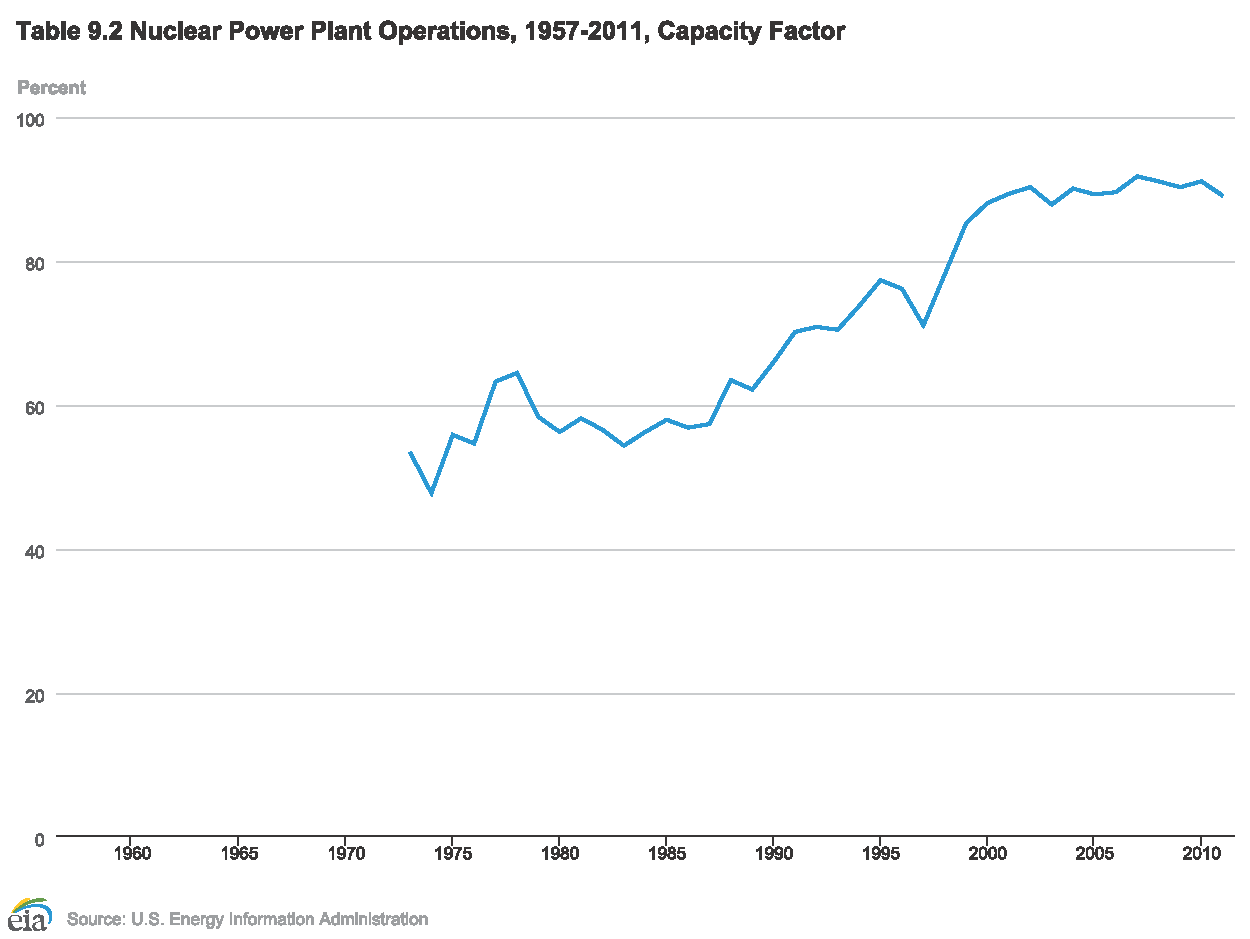
Average capacity factor of US nuclear power plants, 1957–2011

By the mid-1970s, it became clear that nuclear power would not grow nearly as quickly as once believed. Cost overruns were sometimes a factor of ten above original industry estimates, and became a major problem. For the 75 nuclear power reactors built from 1966 to 1977, cost overruns averaged 207 percent. Opposition and problems were galvanized by the Three Mile Island accident in 1979.

Over-commitment to nuclear power brought about the financial collapse of the Washington Public Power Supply System, a public agency which undertook to build five large nuclear power plants in the 1970s. By 1983, cost overruns and delays, along with a slowing of electricity demand growth, led to cancellation of two WPPSS plants and a construction halt on two others. Moreover, WPPSS defaulted on $2.25 billion of municipal bonds, which is one of the largest municipal bond defaults in U.S. history. The court case that followed took nearly a decade to resolve.

Eventually, more than 120 reactor orders were canceled, and the construction of new reactors ground to a halt. Former US Vice President Al Gore, in 2009, commented on the historical record and reliability of nuclear power in the United States:

Of the 253 nuclear power reactors originally ordered in the United States from 1953 to 2008, 48 percent were canceled, 11 percent were prematurely shut down, 14 percent experienced at least a one-year-or-more outage, and 27 percent are operating without having a year-plus outage. Thus, only about one fourth of those ordered, or about half of those completed, are still operating and have proved relatively reliable.

A cover story in the February 11, 1985, issue of Forbes magazine, commented on the overall management of the nuclear power program in the United States:

The failure of the U.S. nuclear power program ranks as the largest managerial disaster in business history, a disaster on a monumental scale … only the blind, or the biased, can now think that the money has been well spent. It is a defeat for the U.S. consumer and for the competitiveness of U.S. industry, for the utilities that undertook the program and for the private enterprise system that made it possible.

=== Three Mile Island and after ===
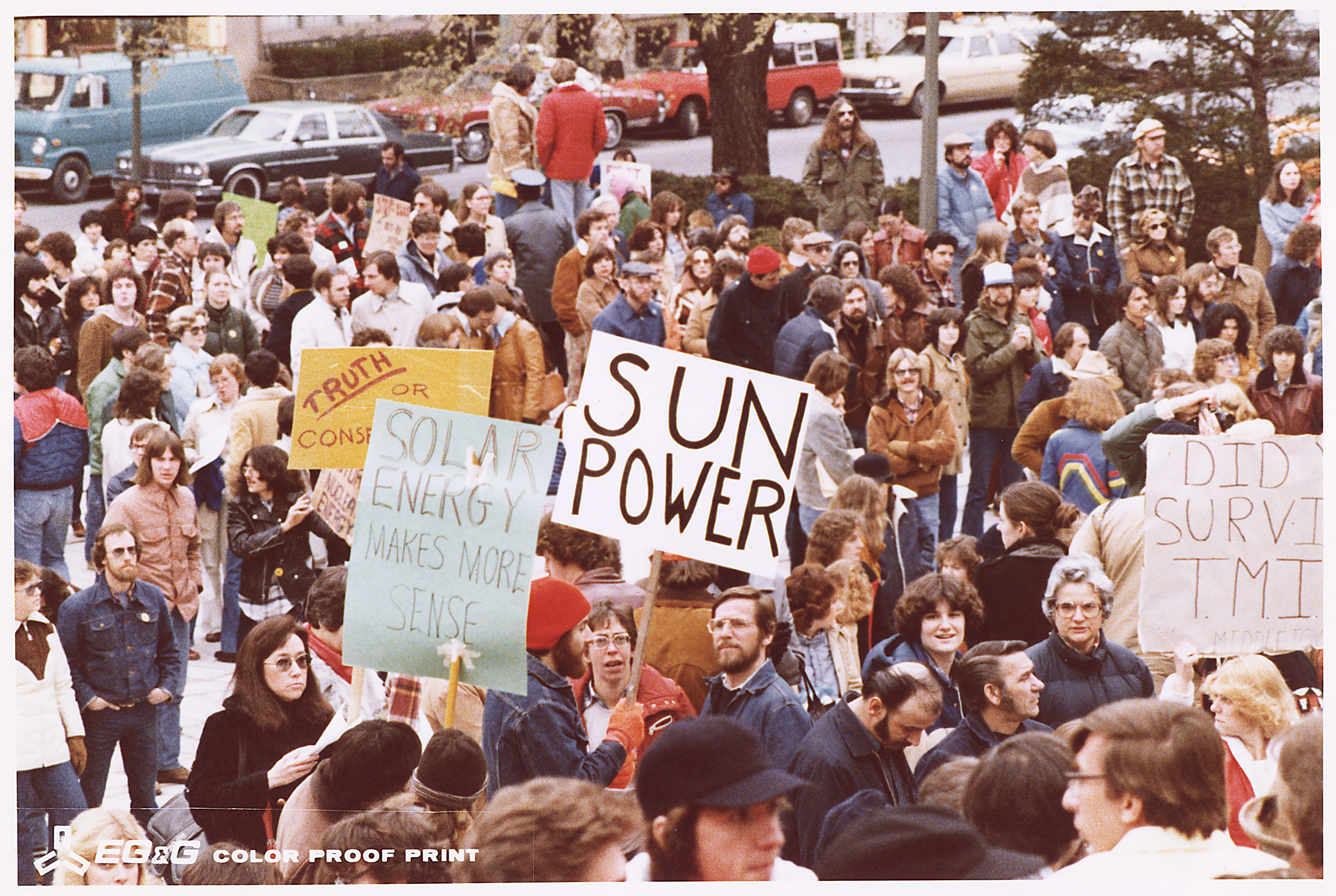
Anti-nuclear rally at Harrisburg, Pennsylvania in April 1979

The NRC reported that the Three Mile Island accident of March 1979 "was the most serious in U.S. commercial nuclear power plant operating history, even though it led to no deaths or injuries to plant workers or members of the nearby community." The World Nuclear Association reports that "...more than a dozen major, independent studies have assessed the radiation releases and possible effects on the people and the environment around TMI since the 1979 accident at TMI-2. The most recent was a 13-year study on 32,000 people. None has found any adverse health effects such as cancers which might be linked to the accident." Other nuclear power incidents within the US (defined as safety-related events in civil nuclear power facilities between INES Levels 1 and 3 include those at the Davis–Besse Nuclear Power Station, which was the source of two of the top five highest conditional core damage frequency nuclear incidents in the United States since 1979, according to the U.S. Nuclear Regulatory Commission.

Despite the concerns which arose among the public after the Three Mile Island incident, the accident highlights the success of the reactor's safety systems. The radioactivity released as a result of the accident was almost entirely confined within the reinforced concrete containment structure. These containment structures, found at all US nuclear power plants, were designed to successfully trap radioactive material in the event of a melt down or accident. At Three Mile Island, the containment structures operated as designed, successful in containing radioactive energy. The low levels of radioactivity released post incident is considered harmless, resulting in zero injuries and deaths of residents living in proximity to the plant.

Despite many technical studies which asserted that the probability of a severe nuclear accident was low, numerous surveys showed that the public remained "very deeply distrustful and uneasy about nuclear power". Some commentators have suggested that the public's consistently negative ratings of nuclear power are reflective of the industry's unique connection with nuclear weapons:

[One] reason why nuclear power is seen differently to other technologies lies in its parentage and birth. Nuclear energy was conceived in secrecy, born of war, and first revealed to the world in horror. No matter how many proponents try to separate the peaceful atom from the weapon's atom, the connection is firmly embedded in the mind of the public.

Several US nuclear power plants closed well before their design lifetimes, due to successful campaigns by anti-nuclear activist groups. These include Rancho Seco in 1989 in California and Trojan in 1992 in Oregon. Humboldt Bay Nuclear Power Plant in northern California closed in 1976, 13 years after geologists discovered it was built on the Little Salmon Fault. Shoreham Nuclear Power Plant was completed but never operated commercially as an authorized Emergency Evacuation Plan could not be agreed on due to the political climate after the Three Mile Island accident and Chernobyl disaster. The last permanent closure of a US nuclear power plant was in 1997.

US nuclear reactors were originally licensed to operate for 40-year periods. In the 1980s, the NRC determined that there were no technical issues that would preclude longer service. Over half of US nuclear reactors are over 30 years old and almost all are over twenty years old. As of 2011, more than 60 reactors have received 20-year extensions to their licensed lifetimes. The average capacity factor for all US reactors has improved from below 60% in the 1970s and 1980s, to 92% in 2007.

After the Three Mile Island accident, NRC-issued reactor construction permits, which had averaged more than 12 per year from 1967 through 1978, came to an abrupt halt; no permits were issued between 1979 and 2012 (in 2012, four planned new reactors received construction permits). Many permitted reactors were never built, or the projects were abandoned. Those that were completed after Three Mile island experienced a much longer time lag from construction permit to starting of operations. The Nuclear Regulatory Commission itself described its regulatory oversight of the long-delayed Seabrook Nuclear Power Plant as "a paradigm of fragmented and uncoordinated government decision making," and "a system strangling itself and the economy in red tape." The number of operating power reactors in the US peaked at 112 in 1991, far fewer than the 177 that received construction permits. By 1998 the number of working reactors declined to 104, where it remained as of 2013. The loss of electrical generation from the eight fewer reactors since 1991 has been offset by power uprates of generating capacity at existing reactors.

Despite the problems following Three Mile Island, output of nuclear-generated electricity in the US grew steadily, more than tripling over the next three decades: from 255 billion kilowatt-hours in 1979 (the year of the Three Mile Island accident), to 806 billion kilowatt-hours in 2007. Part of the increase was due to the greater number of operating reactors, which increased by 51%: from 69 reactors in 1979, to 104 in 2007. Another cause was a large increase in the capacity factor over that period. In 1978, nuclear power plants generated electricity at only 64% of their rated output capacity. Performance suffered even further during and after Three Mile Island, as a series of new safety regulations from 1979 through the mid-1980s forced operators to repeatedly shut down reactors for required retrofits. It was not until 1990 that the average capacity factor of US nuclear plants returned to the level of 1978. The capacity factor continued to rise, until 2001. Since 2001, US nuclear power plants have consistently delivered electric power at about 90% of their rated capacity. In 2016, the number of power plants was at 100 with 4 under construction.

=== Effects of Fukushima ===
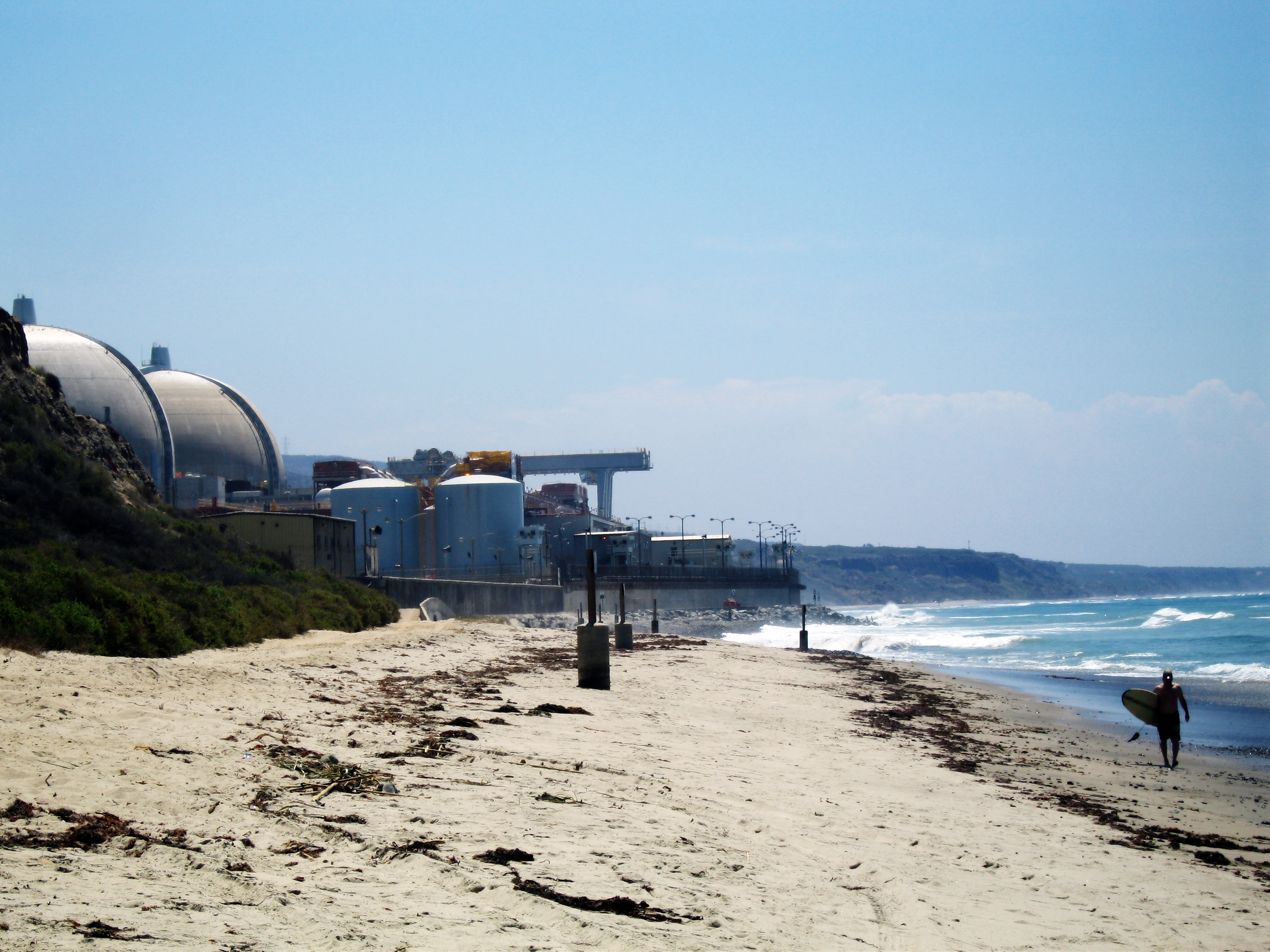
The San Onofre Nuclear Generating Station was shut down in 2013. There is about 1,700 tons of spent nuclear fuel at San Onofre.

Following the 2011 Japanese nuclear accidents, the U.S. Nuclear Regulatory Commission announced it would launch a comprehensive safety review of the 104 nuclear power reactors across the United States, at the request of President Obama. A total of 45 groups and individuals had formally asked the NRC to suspend all licensing and other activities at 21 proposed nuclear reactor projects in 15 states until the NRC had completed a thorough post-Fukushima reactor crisis examination. The petitioners also asked the NRC to supplement its own investigation by establishing an independent commission comparable to that set up in the wake of the serious, though less severe, 1979 Three Mile Island accident. The Obama administration continued "to support the expansion of nuclear power in the United States, despite the crisis in Japan".

An industry observer noted that post-Fukushima costs were likely to go up for both current and new nuclear power plants, due to increased requirements for on-site spent fuel management and elevated design basis threats. License extensions for existing reactors will face additional scrutiny, with outcomes depending on plants meeting new requirements, and some extensions already granted for more than 60 of the 100 operating U.S. reactors could be revisited. On-site storage, consolidated long-term storage, and geological disposal of spent fuel is "likely to be reevaluated in a new light because of the Fukushima storage pool experience". Mark Cooper suggested that the cost of nuclear power, which already had risen sharply in 2010 and 2011, could "climb another 50 percent due to tighter safety oversight and regulatory delays in the wake of the reactor calamity in Japan".

In 2011, London-based bank HSBC said: "With Three Mile Island and Fukushima as a backdrop, the US public may find it difficult to support major nuclear new build and we expect that no new plant extensions will be granted either. Thus we expect the clean energy standard under discussion in US legislative chambers will see a far greater emphasis on gas and renewables plus efficiency".

=== Competitiveness problems ===
In May 2015, a senior vice president of General Atomics stated that the U.S. nuclear industry was struggling because of comparatively low U.S. fossil fuel production costs, partly due to the rapid development of shale gas, and high financing costs for nuclear plants.

In July 2016, Toshiba withdrew the U.S. design certification renewal for its Advanced Boiling Water Reactor because "it has become increasingly clear that energy price declines in the US prevent Toshiba from expecting additional opportunities for ABWR construction projects".

In 2016, Governor of New York Andrew Cuomo directed the New York Public Service Commission to consider ratepayer-financed subsidies similar to those for renewable sources to keep nuclear power stations profitable in the competition against natural gas.

In March 2018, FirstEnergy announced plans to deactivate the Beaver Valley, Davis-Besse, and Perry nuclear power plants, which are in the Ohio and Pennsylvania deregulated electricity market, for economic reasons during the next three years.

In 2019, the Energy Information Administration revised the levelized cost of electricity from new advanced nuclear power plants to be $0.0775/kWh before government subsidies, using a 4.3% cost of capital (WACC) over a 30-year cost recovery period. Financial firm Lazard also updated its levelized cost of electricity report costing new nuclear at between $0.118/kWh and $0.192/kWh using a commercial 7.7% cost of capital (WACC) (pre-tax 12% cost for the higher-risk 40% equity finance and 8% cost for the 60% loan finance) over a 40-year lifetime, making it the most expensive privately financed non-peaking generation technology other than residential solar PV.

In August 2020, Exelon decided to close the Byron and Dresden plants in 2021 for economic reasons, despite the plants having licenses to operate for another 20 and 10 years respectively. On September 13, 2021, the Illinois Senate approved a bill containing nearly $700 million in subsidies for the state's nuclear plants, including Byron, causing Exelon to reverse the shutdown order.

=== Westinghouse Chapter 11 bankruptcy ===
On March 29, 2017, parent company Toshiba placed Westinghouse Electric Company in Chapter 11 bankruptcy because of $9 billion of losses from its nuclear reactor construction projects. The projects responsible for this loss are mostly the construction of four AP1000 reactors at Vogtle in Georgia and V. C. Summer in South Carolina. The U.S. government had given $8.3 billion of loan guarantees for the financing of the Vogtle nuclear plant being built in the U.S., which entered commercial operation in 2023. In July 2017, the V.C. Summer plant owners, the two largest utilities in South Carolina, terminated the project. Peter A. Bradford, former Nuclear Regulatory Commission member, commented, "They placed a big bet on this hallucination of a nuclear renaissance".

The other U.S. new nuclear supplier, General Electric, had already scaled back its nuclear operations as it was concerned about the economic viability of new nuclear.

In the 2000s, interest in nuclear power renewed in the US, spurred by anticipated government curbs on carbon emissions, and a belief that fossil fuels would become more costly. Ultimately however, following Westinghouse's bankruptcy, only two new nuclear reactors were under construction. In addition Watts Bar unit 2, whose construction was started in 1973 but suspended in the 1980s, was completed and commissioned in 2016.

=== Possible renaissance ===
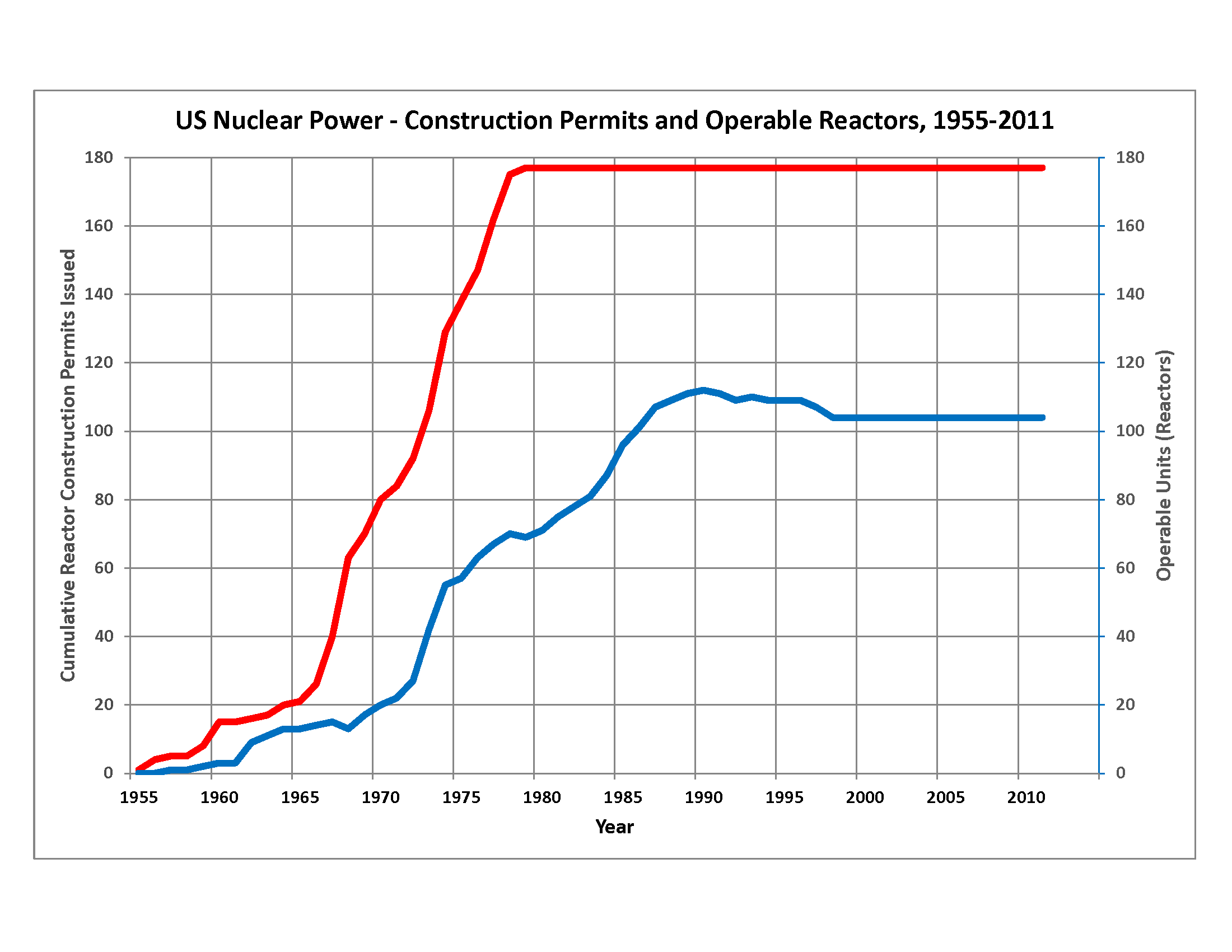
US reactor construction permits issued (red) and operating nuclear power reactors (blue), 1955–2011 (data from US EIA)

In 2008, it was reported that The Shaw Group and Westinghouse would construct a factory at the Port of Lake Charles at Lake Charles, Louisiana to build components for the Westinghouse AP1000 nuclear reactor. On October 23, 2008, it was reported that Northrop Grumman and Areva were planning to construct a factory in Newport News, Virginia to build nuclear reactors.

As of March 2009, the NRC had received applications to construct 26 new reactors with applications for another 7 expected. Six of these reactors were ordered. Some applications were made to reserve places in a queue for government incentives available for the first three plants based on each innovative reactor design.

In May 2009, John Rowe, chairman of Exelon, which operates 17 nuclear reactors, stated that he would cancel or delay construction of two new reactors in Texas without federal loan guarantees. Amory Lovins added that "market forces had killed it years earlier". Lovins has been an active opponent of nuclear energy and fought against it in the 1970s, which contributed to increased costs

In July 2009, the proposed Victoria County Nuclear Power Plant was delayed, as the project proved difficult to finance. As of April 2009, AmerenUE has suspended plans to build its proposed plant in Missouri because the state Legislature would not allow it to charge consumers for some of the project's costs before the plant's completion. The New York Times has reported that without that "financial and regulatory certainty" the company has said it could not proceed. Previously, MidAmerican Energy Company decided to "end its pursuit of a nuclear power plant in Payette County, Idaho." MidAmerican cited cost as the primary factor in its decision.

The federal government encouraged development through the Nuclear Power 2010 Program, which coordinates efforts for building new plants, and the Energy Policy Act. In February 2010, President Barack Obama announced loan guarantees for two new reactors at Georgia Power's Vogtle Electric Generating Plant. The reactors are "just the first of what we hope will be many new nuclear projects," said Carol Browner, director of the White House Office of Energy and Climate Change Policy.

In February 2010, the Vermont Senate voted 26 to 4 to block operation of the Vermont Yankee Nuclear Power Plant after 2012, citing radioactive tritium leaks, misstatements in testimony by plant officials, a cooling tower collapse in 2007, and other problems. By state law, the renewal of the operating license must be approved by both houses of the legislature for the nuclear power plant to continue operation.

In 2010, some companies withdrew their applications. In September 2010, Matthew Wald from The New York Times reported that "the nuclear renaissance is looking small and slow at the moment".

In the first quarter of 2011, renewable energy contributed 11.7 percent of total U.S. energy production (2.245 quadrillion BTUs of energy), surpassing energy production from nuclear power (2.125 quadrillion BTUs). 2011 was the first year since 1997 that renewables exceeded nuclear in US total energy production.

In August 2011, the Tennessee Valley Authority (TVA) board of directors voted to move forward with the construction of the unit one reactor at the Bellefonte Nuclear Generating Station. In addition, the TVA petitioned to restart construction on the first two units at Bellefonte. As of March 2012, many contractors had been laid off and the ultimate cost and timing for Bellefonte 1 will depend on work at another reactor TVA is completing – Watts Bar 2 in Tennessee. In February 2012, TVA said the Watts Bar 2 project was running over budget and behind schedule.

The first two of the newly approved units were Units 3 and 4 at the existing Vogtle Electric Generating Plant. As of December 2011, construction by Southern Company on the two new nuclear units had begun. They were expected to be delivering commercial power by 2016 and 2017, respectively. One week after Southern received its license to begin major construction, a dozen groups sued to stop the expansion project, stating "public safety and environmental problems since Japan's Fukushima Daiichi nuclear reactor accident have not been taken into account". The lawsuit was dismissed in July 2012.

In 2012, The NRC approved construction permits for four new nuclear reactor units at two existing plants, the first permits in 34 years. The first new permits, for two proposed reactors at the Vogtle plant, were approved in February 2012. NRC Chairman Gregory Jaczko cast the lone dissenting vote, citing safety concerns stemming from Japan's 2011 Fukushima nuclear disaster: "I cannot support issuing this license as if Fukushima never happened".

Global status of commercial nuclear deployment as of 2017 Operating reactors, building new reactors Operating reactors, planning new build No reactors, building new reactors No reactors, new in planning Operating reactors, stable Operating reactors, decided on phase-out Civil nuclear power is illegal No commercial reactors

Also in 2012, Units 2 and 3 at the SCANA Virgil C. Summer Nuclear Generating Station in South Carolina were approved, and were scheduled to come online in 2017 and 2018, respectively. After several reforecasted completion dates the project was abandoned in July 2017.

Other reactors were under consideration – a third reactor at the Calvert Cliffs Nuclear Power Plant in Maryland, a third and fourth reactor at South Texas Nuclear Generating Station, together with two other reactors in Texas, four in Florida, and one in Missouri. However, these have all been postponed or canceled.

In August 2012, the US Court of Appeals for the District of Columbia found that the NRC's rules for the temporary storage and permanent disposal of nuclear waste stood in violation of the National Environmental Policy Act, rendering the NRC legally unable to grant final licenses. This ruling was founded on the absence of a final waste repository plan.

In March 2013, the concrete for the basemat of Block 2 of the Virgil C. Summer Nuclear Generating Station was poured. First concrete for Unit 3 was completed on November 4, 2013. Construction on unit 3 of Vogtle Electric Generating Plant started that month. Unit 4 was begun in November 2013. However, following Westinghouse's bankruptcy, the project was abandoned.

In 2015, the Energy Information Administration estimated that nuclear power's share of U.S. generation would fall from 19% to 15% by 2040 in its central estimate (High Oil and Gas Resource case). However, as total generation increases 24% by 2040 in the central estimate, the absolute amount of nuclear generation remains fairly flat.

In 2017, the US Energy Information Administration projected that US nuclear generating capacity would decline 23% from its 2016 level of 99.1 GW, to 76.5 GW in 2050, and the nuclear share of electrical generation would go from 20% in 2016 to 11% in 2050. Driving the decline will be retirements of existing units, to be partially offset by additional units currently under construction and expected capacity expansions of existing reactors.

The Blue Castle Project is set to begin construction near Green River, Utah in 2023. The plant will use 53,500 acre-feet (66 million cubic meters) of water annually from the Green River once both reactors are commissioned. The first reactor is scheduled to come online in 2028, with the second reactor coming online in 2030.

On June 4, 2018, World Nuclear News reported, "President Donald Trump has directed Secretary of Energy Rick Perry to take immediate action to stop the loss of 'fuel-secure power facilities' from the country's power grid, including nuclear power plants that are facing premature retirement."

On August 23, 2020, Forbes reported, that "[the 2020 Democratic Party platform] marks the first time since 1972 that the Democratic Party has said anything positive in its platform about nuclear energy".

In April 2022, the Federal government announced a $6 billion subsidy program targeting the seven plants scheduled for closure as well as others at-risk of closure, to attempt to encourage them to continue operating. It will be funded by the Infrastructure Investment and Jobs Act passed in November 2021.

On May 23, 2025, President Trump issued four executive orders to promote the rapid expansion of nuclear power in the United States. One aimed at reinvigorating the nuclear energy and industrial base and focused on the nuclear fuel cycle, workforce, and supply chain. A second reforming nuclear reactor testing at the Department of Energy, and directed the Secretary of Energy to streamline and accelerate the construction of test reactors. The third aimed at reforming the Nuclear Regulatory Commission and called for the wholesale revision of NRC regulations on reactor construction and operation. And the fourth directed the U.S. Army to begin operating a nuclear reactor at a domestic military base by September 30, 2028. In October 2025, the U.S. Army announced plans under its Janus Program to deploy commercially operated nuclear microreactors at selected military installations, building on lessons from Project Pele.

Westinghouse and its parent companies Cameco and Brookfield Asset Management announced in October 2025 that they had entered a "strategic partnership" with the U.S. government to accelerate deployment of new nuclear, following on from the May executive orders. According to that announcement, the U.S. plans to construct at least $80 billion worth of new Westinghouse reactors. It is not clear which companies will be involved in constructing these reactors, exactly where the money will come from or who will operate the reactors. In June 2026 the U.S. Department of Energy announced $17.5 billion in supply chain loans to support deployment of 10 Westinghouse AP1000 reactors domestically, with the goal of having all 10 under construction by 2030.

It's not clear if that $80 billion includes new plans to revive the abandoned Virgil C. Summer Nuclear Generating Station (VC Summer) new nuclear project in South Carolina. The South Carolina Public Service Authority (Santee Cooper), which owns some of the VC Summer site, in October 2025 selected Brookfield Asset Management to complete construction of the two partially-completed AP1000s at the site. Brookfield and The Nuclear Company, a nuclear project development company, announced a joint venture in May 2026 focused on deploying Westinghouse reactors and specifically completing VC Summer.

==== Small modular reactors ====
Much of the attention in the latest possible nuclear renaissance has focused on small modular reactors (SMRs). Proponents argue that these smaller reactors will have lower overall capital costs and construction timelines than large reactors and can use modular construction techniques to avoid the cost and schedule overruns that frequently occur at large nuclear construction projects. Many SMR designs use passive safety concepts designed to mitigate accidents, and many are designed to be sited closer to population centers or co-located with industry and used for both electricity and heat or steam production. But SMRs may not benefit from the economies of scale of large reactors, therefore potentially producing electricity at a higher cost per kilowatt-hour, and there is so far no data to show that the lower costs and construction timelines will materialize. There are no commercial SMRs in operation in the U.S.

In November 2023, the first small modular reactor (SMR) deployment project in the U.S., the Carbon Free Power Project in Idaho using six light-water NuScale reactors, was cancelled because of cost increases. This raised concerns about the commercial prospects in the U.S. of the other SMR designs.

The U.S. has supported deployment of two "advanced" reactors — non light-water SMRs — through its Advanced Reactor Demonstration Program, awarding funding to TerraPower and X-energy in 2020. TerraPower began construction on its first Natrium sodium-cooled fast reactor plant in Wyoming in April 2026. The plant will include one 345-megawatt reactor and a molten salt-based energy storage system that combined can produce up to 500 megawatts of electricity. X-Energy has plans to deploy four of its Xe-10 high-temperature gas-cooled reactors at Dow Chemical Company's Seadrift site in Texas and to follow this with up to 12 Xe-100 reactors at the Cascade Advanced Energy Facility in Washington.

In March 2026 the U.S. and Japan announced an up to $40 billion investment in deploying GE Vernova Hitachi's BWRX-300 light-water SMRs in Tennessee and Alabama. It is not clear which companies will be involved in constructing these reactors, exactly where the money will come from or who will operate the reactors. Federally-owned U.S. utility Tennessee Valley Authority submitted a construction permit application to the NRC in April 2025 to construct one BWRX-300 at its Clinch River site in Tennessee, which could be part of this $40 billion investment.

Holtec International submitted a construction permit application to the NRC in December 2025 for construction of two of its 300 megawatt light-water SMRs at the Palisades Energy Center in Michigan.

Interest in new nuclear power, and specifically SMRs, has been boosted by a combination of concerns about climate change, energy security and being able to provide sufficient electricity for AI data centers, and dozens of other companies are in pre-application discussions with the NRC for deployment of various reactor designs.

The US Army announced in 2026 that under its Janus Program, it would spend up to $2.2 billion to help fund the development of five microreactors from five separate companies, with plans to install an SMR at five bases across the country. The reactors will be built by Antares Nuclear for Fort Bragg; BWX Technologies at Fort Campbell; General Atomics at Fort Hood; Radiant Industries for Fort Benning; and Westinghouse Government Services at Fort Drum.

==== Reopening ====
In January 2024, it was announced that Holtec International was receiving $1.5 billion from the U.S. Department of Energy to restart the Palisades nuclear plant. The goal is to have the 800 megawatt plant running by 2025. This move has precedent as the Biden administration has given a previous loan of $1.1 billion to keep the Diablo Canyon nuclear plant in California running.

Microsoft announced in September 2024 a deal with Constellation Energy to reopen the long-dormant Three Mile Island Nuclear Power Plant, securing 100% of its electricity output for the next 20 years. If approved, this would be the first-ever recommissioning of a nuclear plant in U.S. history. The plan faces rigorous regulatory hurdles, requiring extensive reviews from the U.S. Nuclear Regulatory Commission (NRC) before the plant can return to operation. Once fully operational, the revived facility is expected to generate 835 megawatts of electricity. The estimated $1.6 billion cost for reopening and modernizing the plant hinges on tax incentives for nuclear energy included in the 2022 Inflation Reduction Act.

== Nuclear power plants ==
Nuclear power plants in United States Active plants Canceled plants Closed plants Under construction Planned plants

As of 2020, a total of 88 nuclear power plants have been built in the United States, 86 of which have had at least one operational reactor.

In 2019 the NRC approved a second 20-year license extension for Turkey Point units 3 and 4, the first time NRC had extended licenses to 80 years total lifetime. Similar extensions for about 20 reactors are planned or intended, with more expected in the future.

== Safety and accidents ==
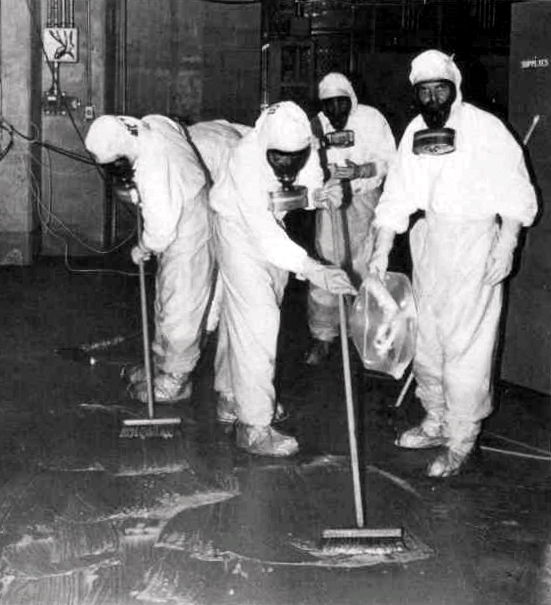
A cleanup crew working to remove radioactive contamination after the Three Mile Island accident

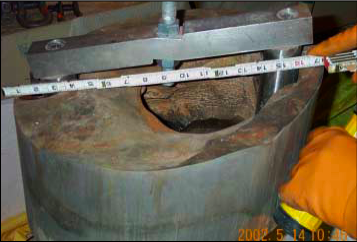
Erosion of the 6-inch-thick (150 mm) carbon steel reactor head at Davis–Besse Nuclear Power Station in 2002, caused by a persistent leak of borated water.

Regulation of nuclear power plants in the United States is conducted by the Nuclear Regulatory Commission (NRC), which divides the nation into 4 administrative divisions.

=== Three Mile Island ===
On March 28, 1979, equipment failures and operator error contributed to loss of coolant and a partial core meltdown at the Three Mile Island Nuclear Power Plant in Pennsylvania. The mechanical failures were compounded by the initial failure of plant operators to recognize the situation as a loss-of-coolant accident due to inadequate training and human factors, such as human-computer interaction design oversights relating to ambiguous control room indicators in the power plant's user interface. The scope and complexity of the accident became clear over the course of five days, as employees of Metropolitan Edison, Pennsylvania state officials, and members of the U.S. NRC tried to understand the problem, communicate the situation to the press and local community, decide whether the accident required an emergency evacuation, and ultimately end the crisis. The NRC's authorization of the release of 40,000 gallons of radioactive waste water directly in the Susquehanna River led to a loss of credibility with the press and community.

The Three Mile Island accident inspired Perrow's book Normal Accidents, where a nuclear accident occurs, resulting from an unanticipated interaction of multiple failures in a complex system. TMI was an example of a normal accident because it was "unexpected, incomprehensible, uncontrollable and unavoidable". The World Nuclear Association has stated that cleanup of the damaged nuclear reactor system at TMI-2 took nearly 12 years and cost approximately US$973 million. Benjamin K. Sovacool, in his 2007 preliminary assessment of major energy accidents, estimated that the TMI accident caused a total of $2.4 billion in property damages. The health effects of the Three Mile Island accident are widely, but not universally, agreed to be very low level. The accident triggered protests around the world.

The 1979 Three Mile Island accident was a pivotal event that led to questions about U.S. nuclear safety. Earlier events had a similar effect, including a 1975 fire at Browns Ferry and the 1976 testimonials of three concerned General Electric (GE) nuclear engineers, the GE Three. In 1981, workers inadvertently reversed pipe restraints at the Diablo Canyon Power Plant reactors in California, compromising seismic protection systems, which further undermined confidence in nuclear safety. All of these well-publicized events undermined public support for the U.S. nuclear industry in the 1970s and the 1980s.

=== Other incidents ===
On March 5, 2002, maintenance workers discovered that corrosion had eaten a football-sized hole into the reactor vessel head of the Davis–Besse nuclear power plant. Although the corrosion did not lead to an accident, this was considered to be a serious nuclear safety incident. The Nuclear Regulatory Commission kept Davis–Besse shut down until March 2004, so that FirstEnergy was able to perform all the necessary maintenance for safe operations. The NRC imposed its largest fine ever—more than $5 million—against FirstEnergy for the actions that led to the corrosion. The company paid an additional $28 million in fines under a settlement with the U.S. Department of Justice.

In 2013, the San Onofre Nuclear Generating Station in California was permanently retired when premature wear was found in the Steam Generators, which had been replaced in 2010–2011.

The nuclear industry in the United States has maintained one of the best industrial safety records in the world with respect to all kinds of accidents. For 2008, the industry hit a new low of 0.13 industrial accidents per 200,000 worker-hours. This is improved over 0.24 in 2005, which was still a factor of 14.6 less than the 3.5 number for all manufacturing industries. However, more than a quarter of U.S. nuclear plant operators "have failed to properly tell regulators about equipment defects that could imperil reactor safety", according to a Nuclear Regulatory Commission report in 2011.

As of February 2009, the NRC requires that the design of new power plants ensures that the reactor containment would remain intact, cooling systems would continue to operate, and spent fuel pools would be protected, in the event of an aircraft crash. This is an issue that has gained attention since the September 11 attacks. The regulation does not apply to the 100 commercial reactors now operating. However, the containment structures of nuclear power plants are among the strongest structures ever built by mankind; independent studies have shown that existing plants would easily survive the impact of a large commercial jetliner without loss of structural integrity.

Recent concerns have been expressed about safety issues affecting a large part of the nuclear fleet of reactors. In 2012, the Union of Concerned Scientists, which tracks ongoing safety issues at operating nuclear plants, found that "leakage of radioactive materials is a pervasive problem at almost 90 percent of all reactors, as are issues that pose a risk of nuclear accidents". The U.S. Nuclear Regulatory Commission reports that radioactive tritium has leaked from 48 of the 65 nuclear sites in the United States.

=== Post-Fukushima concerns ===
Following the Japanese Fukushima nuclear accident, according to Black & Veatch’s annual utility survey that took place after the disaster, of the 700 executives from the US electric utility industry that were surveyed, nuclear safety was the top concern. There are likely to be increased requirements for on-site spent fuel management and elevated design basis threats at nuclear power plants. License extensions for existing reactors will face additional scrutiny, with outcomes depending on the degree to which plants can meet new requirements, and some extensions already granted for more than 60 of the 104 operating U.S. reactors could be revisited. On-site storage, consolidated long-term storage, and geological disposal of spent fuel is "likely to be reevaluated in a new light because of the Fukushima storage pool experience". In March 2011, nuclear experts told Congress that spent-fuel pools at US nuclear power plants are too full. They say the entire US spent-fuel policy should be overhauled in light of the Fukushima I nuclear accidents.

David Lochbaum, chief nuclear safety officer with the Union of Concerned Scientists, has repeatedly questioned the safety of the Fukushima I Plant's General Electric Mark 1 reactor design, which is used in almost a quarter of the United States' nuclear fleet.

About one third of reactors in the US are boiling water reactors, the same technology which was involved in the Fukushima Daiichi nuclear disaster. There are also eight nuclear power plants located along the seismically active West coast. Twelve of the American reactors that are of the same vintage as the Fukushima Daiichi plant are in seismically active areas. Earthquake risk is often measured by "Peak Ground Acceleration", or PGA, and the following nuclear power plants have a two percent or greater chance of having PGA over 0.15g in the next 50 years: Diablo Canyon, California; San Onofre, California; Sequoyah, Tennessee; H.B. Robinson, South Carolina; Watts Bar, Tennessee; Virgil C. Summer, South Carolina; Vogtle, Georgia; Indian Point, New York; Oconee, South Carolina; and Seabrook, New Hampshire. Most nuclear plants are designed to keep operating up to 0.2g, but can withstand PGA much higher than 0.2.

Nuclear power plant accidents in the U.S. with more than US$140 million in property damage
Date	Plant	Location	Description	Cost (in millions $2006)
March 28, 1979	Three Mile Island	Londonderry Township, Pennsylvania	Loss of coolant and partial core meltdown, see Three Mile Island accident and Three Mile Island accident health effects	US$2,400
March 9, 1985	Browns Ferry	Athens, Alabama	Instrumentation systems malfunction during startup, which led to suspension of operations at all three Units	US$1,830
April 11, 1986	Pilgrim	Plymouth, Massachusetts	Recurring equipment problems force emergency shutdown of Boston Edison's plant	US$1,001
March 31, 1987	Peach Bottom	Delta, Pennsylvania	Units 2 and 3 shutdown due to cooling malfunctions and unexplained equipment problems	US$400
December 19, 1987	Nine Mile Point	Scriba, New York	Malfunctions force Niagara Mohawk Power Corporation to shut down Unit 1	US$150
February 20, 1996	Millstone	Waterford, Connecticut	Leaking valve forces shutdown of Units 1 and 2, multiple equipment failures found	US$254
September 2, 1996	Crystal River	Crystal River, Florida	Balance-of-plant equipment malfunction forces shutdown and extensive repairs	US$384
February 1, 2010	Vermont Yankee	Vernon, Vermont	Deteriorating underground pipes leak radioactive tritium into groundwater supplies	US$700

=== Security and deliberate attacks ===
The United States 9/11 Commission has said that nuclear power plants were potential targets originally considered for the September 11 attacks. If terrorist groups could sufficiently damage safety systems to cause a core meltdown at a nuclear power plant, and/or sufficiently damage spent fuel pools, such an attack could lead to widespread radioactive contamination. The research scientist Harold Feiveson has written that nuclear facilities should be made extremely safe from attacks that could release massive quantities of radioactivity into the community. New reactor designs have features of passive nuclear safety, which may help. In the United States, the NRC carries out "Force on Force" (FOF) exercises at all Nuclear Power Plant (NPP) sites at least once every three years.

== Uranium supply ==
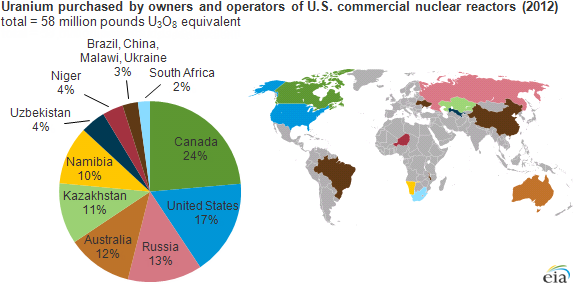
Sources of uranium fuel for the US commercial nuclear power industry in 2012 (US Energy Information Administration)

A 2012 report by the International Atomic Energy Agency concluded: "The currently defined uranium resource base is more than adequate to meet high-case requirements through 2035 and well into the foreseeable future."

At the start of 2013, the identified remaining worldwide uranium resources stood at 5.90 million tons, enough to supply the world's reactors at current consumption rates for more than 120 years, even if no additional uranium deposits are discovered in the meantime. Undiscovered uranium resources as of 2013, were estimated to be 7.7 million tons. Doubling the price of uranium would increase the identified reserves as of 2013 to 7.64 million tons. Over the decade 2003–2013, the identified reserves of uranium (at the same price of US$130/kg) rose from 4.59 million tons in 2003 to 5.90 million tons in 2013, an increase of 28%.

== Fuel cycle ==
=== Uranium mining ===
The United States has the 4th largest uranium reserves in the world. The U.S. has its most prominent uranium reserves in the states of New Mexico, Texas, and Wyoming. The U.S. Department of Energy has approximated there to be at least 300 million pounds of uranium in these areas. Domestic production increased until 1980, after which it declined sharply due to low uranium prices. In 2024, uranium mined in the United States accounted for 8% of all uranium delivered to U.S. nuclear power plant owners and operators. The remainder was imported, principally from Canada, Kazakhstan and Australia. Uranium is mined using several methods including open-pit mining, underground mining, and in-situ leaching. As of 2017, there are more than 4000 abandoned uranium mines in the western US, with 520 to over 1000 on Navajo land, and many others being located on other tribal lands.

=== Uranium enrichment ===
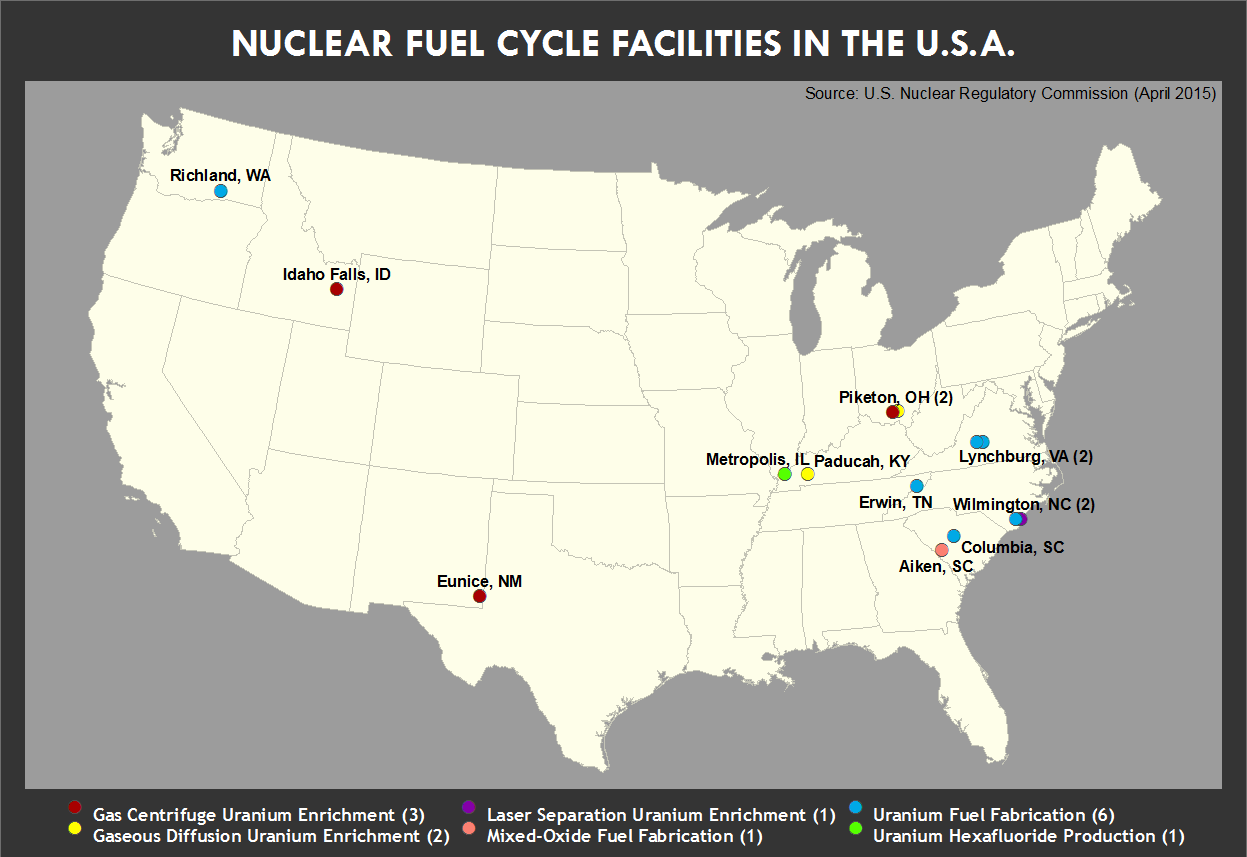
Location of nuclear reactor fuel processing facilities in the United States (US NRC)

There is one gas centrifuge enrichment plant currently in commercial operation in the U.S. The National Enrichment Facility, operated by URENCO east of Eunice, New Mexico, was the first uranium enrichment plant in 30 years to be built in the US. The plant started enriching uranium in 2010. That facility has capacity to produce 4.3 million separative work units per year, roughly one-third of U.S. demand, and Urenco announced plans in June 2026 to expand its capacity by nearly 50% by 2036.

Two additional gas centrifuge plants have been licensed by the NRC, but are not operating. The American Centrifuge Plant in Piketon, Ohio broke ground in 2007, but stopped construction in 2009. The Eagle Rock Enrichment Facility in Bonneville County, Idaho was licensed in 2011, but construction is on hold.

Previously (2008), demonstration activities were underway in Oak Ridge, Tennessee for a future centrifugal enrichment plant. The new plant would have been called the American Centrifuge Plant, at an estimated cost of US$2.3 billion. As of September 30, 2015, the U.S. Department of Energy was ending its contract with the American Centrifuge Project and has stopped funding the project.

In January 2026, the U.S. Department of Energy announced awards of $900 million each to Centrus Energy subsidiary American Centrifuge Operating, General Matter and Orano to start enriching uranium in the U.S. The awards are designed to reduce U.S. reliance on foreign enrichment companies. Centrus and General Matter are tasked with creating domestic capacity to produce high-assay low-enriched uranium (Haleu) enriched to 5%+ ^{235}U and Orano is tasked with creating domestic capacity to produce low-enriched uranium (LEU) enriched up to 5% ^{235}U.

Centrus plans to expand its existing Piketon, Ohio enrichment facility to have capacity to produce 12 tons of Haleu per year along with an unspecified quantity of LEU, using its American Centrifuge technology. Orano plans to construct a "Project Ike" enrichment facility in Oak Ridge, Tennessee at a cost of $5 billion, which will use the ETC centrifuge technology that Orano already uses in France and that Urenco uses internationally. General Matter has not disclosed its enrichment technology, but plans to construct a first $1.5 billion enrichment facility in Paducah, Kentucky.

BWX Technologies plans to apply for an NRC license to enrich uranium in the first quarter of 2027 in order to build a enrichment facility in Erwin, Tennessee that will eventually produce highly enriched uranium for naval reactors. The facility is expected to enter operation around 2035.

In 2025, Vogtle Unit 2 reactor in Waynesboro, Georgia, was the first commercial US reactor to make use of high-assay low-enriched uranium fuel.

=== Reprocessing ===
Nuclear reprocessing has been politically controversial because of the alleged potential to contribute to nuclear proliferation, the alleged vulnerability to nuclear terrorism, the debate over whether and where to dispose of spent fuel in a deep geological repository, and because of disputes about its economics compared to the once-through fuel cycle. The Obama administration disallowed reprocessing of spent fuel, citing nuclear proliferation concerns. Opponents of reprocessing contend that the recycled materials could be used for weapons. However, it is unlikely that reprocessed plutonium or other material extracted from commercial spent fuel would be used for nuclear weapons, because it is not weapons-grade material. Nonetheless, according to the Union of Concerned Scientists, it is possible that terrorists could steal these materials, because the reprocessed plutonium is less radiotoxic than spent fuel and therefore easier to handle.

Additionally, it has been argued that reprocessing is more expensive when compared with spent fuel storage. One study by the Boston Consulting Group estimated that reprocessing is six percent more expensive than spent fuel storage while another study by the Kennedy School of Government stated that reprocessing is 100 percent more expensive. Those two data points indicate that calculations as to the cost of nuclear reprocessing and the production of MOX-fuel compared to the "once thru fuel cycle" and disposal in deep geological repository are difficult and results tend to vary widely even among dispassionate expert observers – let alone those whose results are colored by a political or economic agenda. Furthermore, fluctuations on the uranium market can make usage of MOX-fuel or even re-enrichment of reprocessed uranium more or less economical depending on long term price trends.

The second Trump administration released multiple requests for application in 2026 which have the potential to make U.S. Department of Energy sites and facilities available for companies to pursue recycling of nuclear fuel -- potentially encompassing everything from reprocessing to MOX fuel fabrication.

=== Waste disposal ===
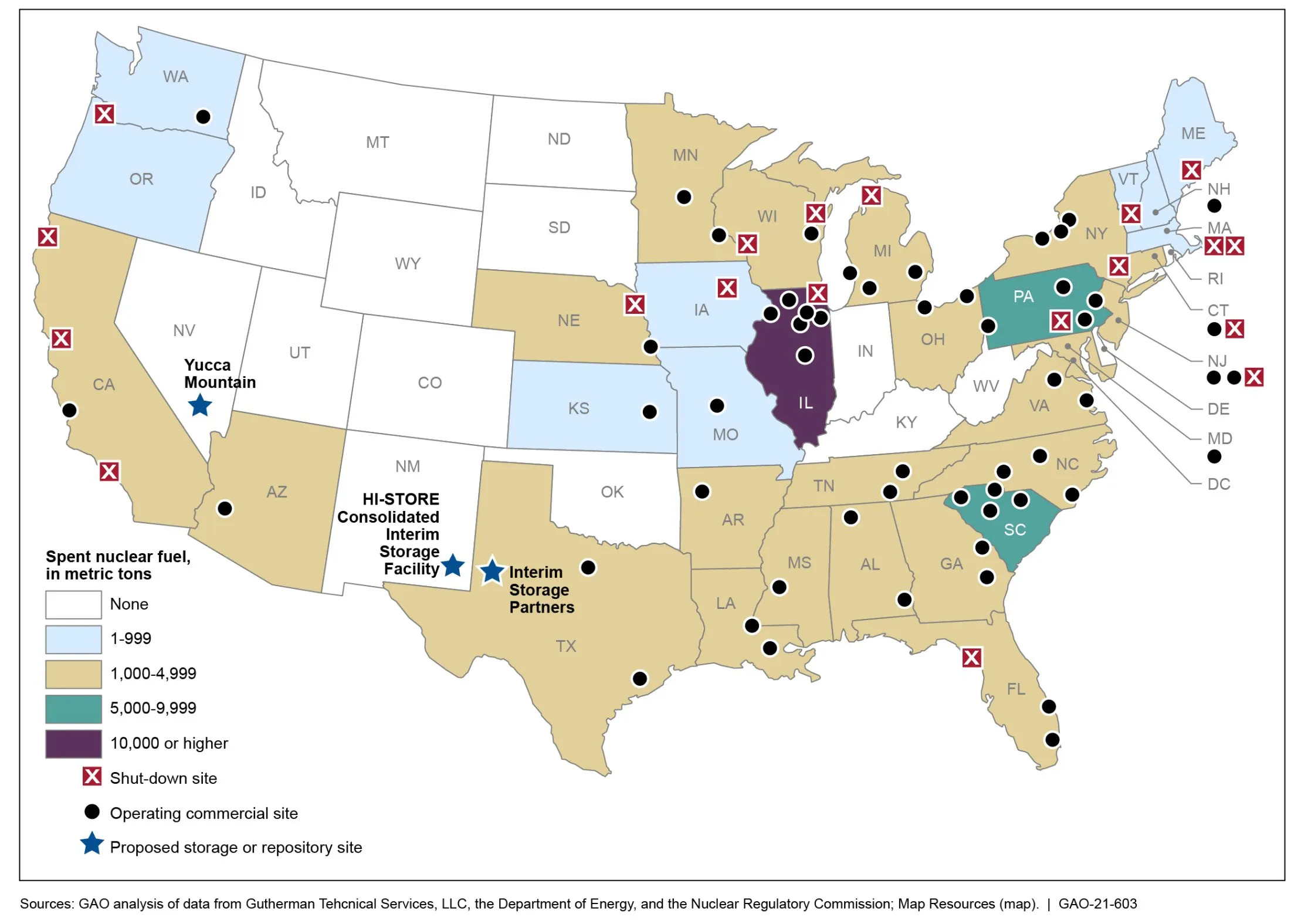
A map of locations in the United States where spent nuclear fuel from commercial nuclear power reactors is stored

Recently, as plants continue to age, many on-site spent fuel pools have come near capacity, prompting the creation of dry cask storage facilities. Several lawsuits between utilities and the government have been filed over the cost of these facilities, because by law the government is required to pay for storage beyond the spent fuel pool.

There are some 65,000 tons of nuclear waste now in temporary storage throughout the U.S. Since 1987, Yucca Mountain, in Nevada, had been the proposed site for the Yucca Mountain nuclear waste repository, but the project was shelved in 2009 following years of controversy and legal wrangling. Yucca Mountain is on Native American land and is considered sacred. Native Americans have not consented to having any nuclear waste plants placed in this area. An alternative plan has not been proffered. In June 2018, the Trump administration and some members of Congress again began proposing using Yucca Mountain, with Nevada Senators raising opposition.

At places like Maine Yankee, Connecticut Yankee and Rancho Seco, reactors no longer operate, but the spent fuel remains in small concrete-and-steel casks that require maintenance and monitoring by a guard force. Sometimes the presence of nuclear waste prevents re-use of the sites by industry.

Without a long-term solution to store nuclear waste, a nuclear renaissance in the U.S. remains unlikely. Nine states have "explicit moratoria on new nuclear power until a storage solution emerges".

Some nuclear power advocates argue that the United States should develop factories and reactors that will recycle some spent fuel. But the Blue Ribbon Commission on America's Nuclear Future said in 2012 that, "no existing technology was adequate for that purpose, given cost considerations and the risk of nuclear proliferation". A major recommendation was that "the United States should undertake...one or more permanent deep geological facilities for the safe disposal of spent fuel and high-level nuclear waste".

There is an "international consensus on the advisability of storing nuclear waste in deep underground repositories", but no country in the world has yet opened such a site. The Obama administration disallowed reprocessing of nuclear waste, citing nuclear proliferation concerns.

The U.S. Nuclear Waste Policy Act, a fund which previously received $750 million in fee revenues each year from the nation's combined nuclear electric utilities, had an unspent balance of $44.5 billion as of the end of FY2017, when a court ordered the federal government to cease withdrawing from the fund, until it provides a destination for the utilities commercial spent fuel.

Horizontal drillhole disposal describes proposals to drill over one kilometer vertically, and two kilometers horizontally in the earth's crust, for the purpose of disposing of high-level waste forms such as spent nuclear fuel, Caesium-137, or Strontium-90. After the emplacement and the retrievability period, drill holes would be backfilled and sealed. A series of tests of the technology were carried out in November 2018 and then again publicly in January 2019 by a U.S. based private company. The test demonstrated the emplacement of a test-canister in a horizontal drillhole and retrieval of the same canister. There was no actual high-level waste used in the test.

== Water use in nuclear power production ==
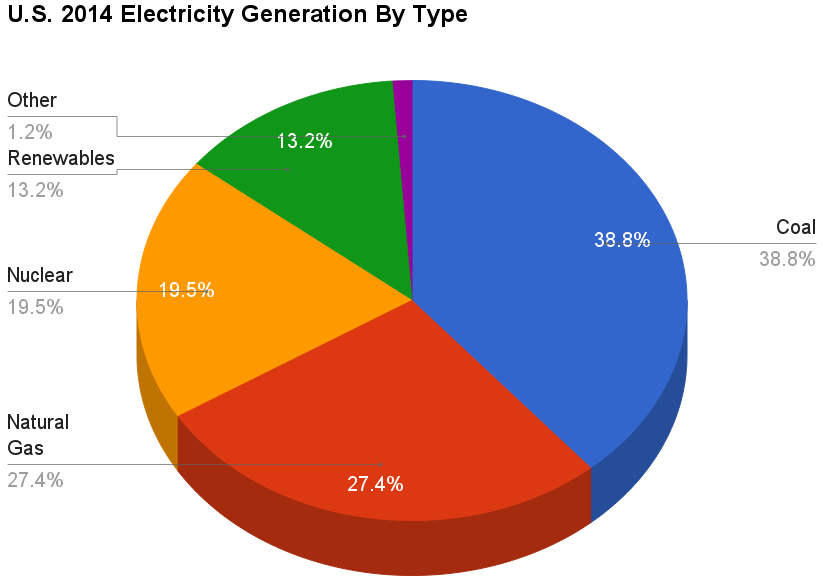
U.S. 2014 Electricity Generation By Type

A 2011, NREL study of water use in electricity generation concluded that the median nuclear plant with cooling towers consumed 672 gallons per megawatt-hour (gal/MWh), a usage similar to that of coal plants, but more than other generating technologies, except hydroelectricity (median reservoir evaporation loss of 4,491 gal/MWh) and concentrating solar power (786 gal/MWh for power tower designs, and 865 for trough). Nuclear plants with once-through cooling systems consume only 269 gal/MWh, but require withdrawal of 44,350 gal/MWh. This makes nuclear plants with once-through cooling susceptible to drought.

A 2008 study by the Associated Press found that of the 104 nuclear reactors in the U.S., "... 24 are in areas experiencing the most severe levels of drought. All but two are built on the shores of lakes and rivers and rely on submerged intake pipes to draw billions of gallons of water for use in cooling and condensing steam after it has turned the plants’ turbines," much like all Rankine cycle power plants. During the 2008 southeast drought, reactor output was reduced to lower operating power or forced to shut down for safety.

The Palo Verde Nuclear Generating Station is located in a desert and purchases reclaimed wastewater for cooling.

== Plant decommissioning ==
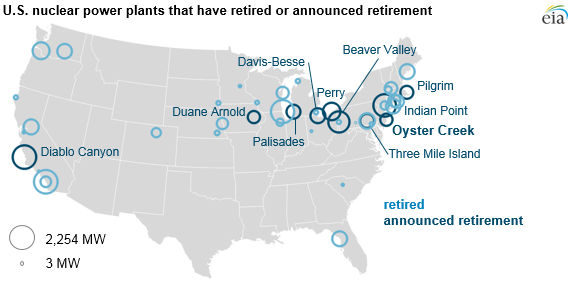
Nuclear Power plants that have been decommissioned or have announced plans to decommission; the size of the circles indicates the amount of electricity generated.

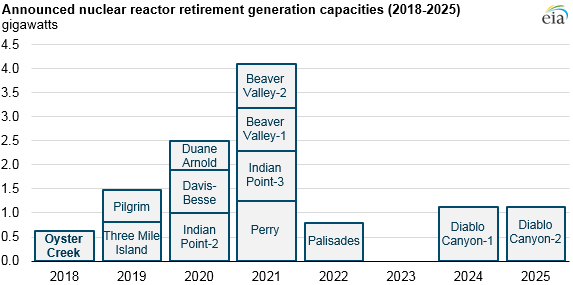
Timeline and operating capacity of plants planned to be decommissioned from 2018 to 2025

The price of energy inputs and the environmental costs of every nuclear power plant continue long after the facility has finished generating its last useful electricity. Both nuclear reactors and uranium enrichment facilities must be decommissioned, returning the facility and its parts to a safe enough level to be entrusted for other uses. After a cooling-off period that may last as long as a century, reactors must be dismantled and cut into small pieces to be packed in containers for final disposal. The process is very expensive, time-consuming, dangerous for workers, hazardous to the natural environment, and presents new opportunities for human error, accidents or sabotage.

The total energy required for decommissioning can be as much as 50% more than the energy needed for the original construction. In most cases, the decommissioning process costs between US$300 million to US$5.6 billion. Decommissioning at nuclear sites which have experienced a serious accident are the most expensive and time-consuming. In the U.S. there are 13 reactors that have permanently shut down and are in some phase of decommissioning, but none of them have completed the process.

New methods for decommissioning have been developed in order to minimize the usual high decommissioning costs. One of these methods is in situ decommissioning (ISD), which was implemented at the U.S. Department of Energy Savannah River Site in South Carolina for the closures of the P and R Reactors. With this tactic, the cost of decommissioning both reactors was $73 million. In comparison, the decommissioning of each reactor using traditional methods would have been an estimated $250 million. This results in a 71% decrease in cost by using ISD.

In the United States, a Nuclear Waste Policy Act and Nuclear Decommissioning Trust Fund is legally required, with utilities banking 0.1 to 0.2 cents/kWh during operations to fund future decommissioning. They must report regularly to the Nuclear Regulatory Commission (NRC) on the status of their decommissioning funds. About 70% of the total estimated cost of decommissioning all U.S. nuclear power reactors has already been collected (on the basis of the average cost of $320 million per reactor-steam turbine unit).

As of 2011, there are 13 reactors that had permanently shut down and are in some phase of decommissioning. With Connecticut Yankee Nuclear Power Plant and Yankee Rowe Nuclear Power Station having completed the process in 2006–2007, after ceasing commercial electricity production circa 1992. The majority of the 15 years, was used to allow the station to naturally cool-down on its own, which makes the manual disassembly process both safer and less expensive.

The number of nuclear power reactors is shrinking as they near the end of their life. It is expected that by 2025, many of the reactors will have been shut down due to their age. Because the costs associated with the construction of nuclear reactors is also continuously increasing, this is expected to be problematic for the provision of energy in the U.S. When reactors are shut down, stakeholders in the energy sector have often not replaced them with renewable energy resources but rather with coal or natural gas. This is because unlike renewable energy sources such as wind and solar, coal and natural gas can be used to generate electricity on a 24-hour basis.

== Organizations ==
=== Fuel vendors ===
The following companies have active Nuclear fuel fabrication facilities in the United States. These are all light water fuel fabrication facilities because only Light Water Reactors are operating in the US. The US currently has no MOX fuel fabrication facilities, though Duke Energy has expressed intent of building one of a relatively small capacity.

- Framatome

Framatome (formerly Areva) runs fabrication facilities in Lynchburg, Virginia and Richland, Washington. It also has a Generation III+ plant design, EPR (formerly the Evolutionary Power Reactor), which it plans to market in the US.

- Westinghouse Electric Company

Westinghouse operates a fuel fabrication facility in Columbia, South Carolina, which processes 1,600 metric tons of Uranium (MTU) per year. It previously operated a nuclear fuel plant in Hematite, Missouri but has since closed it.

- GE Vernova (GE)

GE pioneered the boiling water reactor technology that has become widely used throughout the world. It formed the Global Nuclear Fuel joint venture in 1999 with Hitachi and Toshiba and later restructured into GE-Hitachi Nuclear Energy. It operates the fuel fabrication facility in Wilmington, North Carolina, with a capacity of 1,200 MTU per year.

- KazAtomProm

KazAtomProm and the US company Centrus Energy have a partnership related to supplies of Kazakhstan's uranium to the US market.

=== Industry and academic ===
The American Nuclear Society (ANS) scientific and educational organization has academic and industry members. The organization publishes literature on nuclear technology in several journals. The ANS also has offshoot organizations such as North American Young Generation in Nuclear (NA-YGN).

The Nuclear Energy Institute (NEI) is an industry group whose activities include lobbying, experience sharing between companies and plants, and provides data on the industry to a number of organizations.

=== Anti-nuclear power groups ===
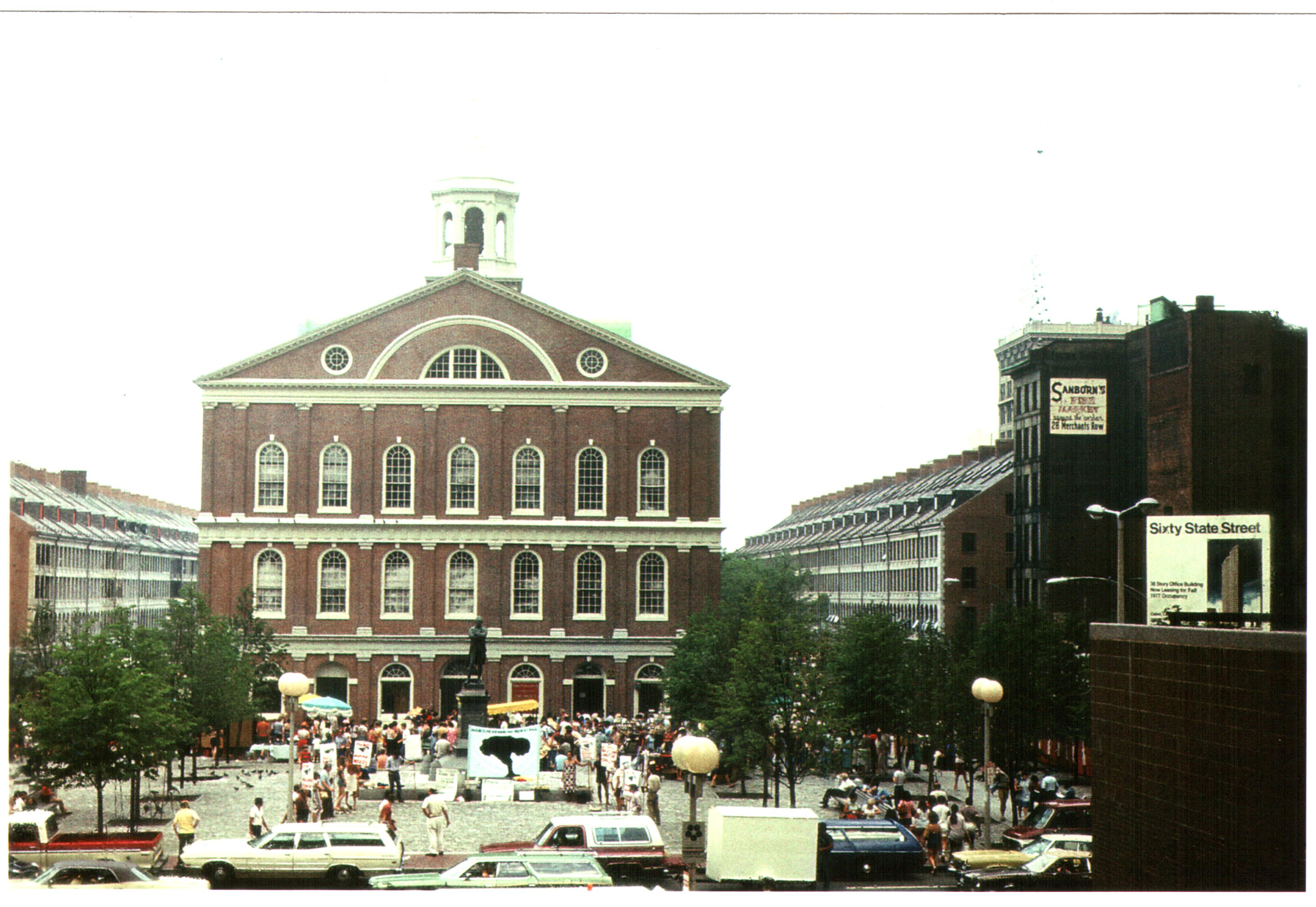
Anti-nuclear protest, Boston, Massachusetts, 1977

Some sixty anti-nuclear power groups are operating, or have operated, in the United States. These include: Abalone Alliance, Clamshell Alliance, Greenpeace USA, Institute for Energy and Environmental Research, Musicians United for Safe Energy, Nuclear Control Institute, Nuclear Information and Resource Service, Public Citizen Energy Program, Shad Alliance, and the Sierra Club.

In 1992, the chairman of the Nuclear Regulatory Commission said that "his agency had been pushed in the right direction on safety issues because of the pleas and protests of nuclear watchdog groups".

== Debate ==
There has been considerable public and scientific debate about the use of nuclear power in the United States, mainly from the 1960s to the late 1980s, but also since about 2001 when talk of a nuclear renaissance began. There has been debate about issues such as nuclear accidents, radioactive waste disposal, nuclear proliferation, nuclear economics, and nuclear terrorism.

Some scientists and engineers have expressed reservations about nuclear power, including Barry Commoner, S. David Freeman, John Gofman, Arnold Gundersen, Mark Z. Jacobson, Amory Lovins, Arjun Makhijani, Gregory Minor, and Joseph Romm. Mark Z. Jacobson, professor of civil and environmental engineering at Stanford University, has said: "If our nation wants to reduce global warming, air pollution and energy instability, we should invest only in the best energy options. Nuclear energy isn't one of them". Arnold Gundersen, chief engineer of Fairewinds Associates and a former nuclear power industry executive, has questioned the safety of the Westinghouse AP1000, a proposed third-generation nuclear reactor. John Gofman, a nuclear chemist and doctor, raised concerns about exposure to low-level radiation in the 1960s and argued against commercial nuclear power in the U.S. In "Nuclear Power: Climate Fix or Folly", Amory Lovins, a physicist with the Rocky Mountain Institute, argued that expanded nuclear power "does not represent a cost-effective solution to global warming and that investors would shun it were it not for generous government subsidies lubricated by intensive lobbying efforts".

Patrick Moore (an early Greenpeace member and former president of Greenpeace Canada) spoke out against nuclear power in 1976, but today he supports it, along with renewable energy sources. In Australian newspaper The Age, he writes "Greenpeace is wrong – we must consider nuclear power". He argues that any realistic plan to reduce reliance on fossil fuels or greenhouse gas emissions requires increased use of nuclear energy. Phil Radford, executive director of Greenpeace US responded that nuclear energy is too risky, takes too long to build to address climate change, and claimed that the can U.S. shift to nearly 100% renewable energy while phasing out nuclear power by 2050.

Environmentalist Stewart Brand wrote the book Whole Earth Discipline, which examines how nuclear power and some other technologies can be used as tools to address global warming. Bernard Cohen, professor emeritus of Physics at the University of Pittsburgh, calculates that nuclear power is many times safer than other forms of power generation.

US President Obama early on included nuclear power as part of his "all of the above" energy strategy. In a speech to the International Brotherhood of Electrical Workers in 2010, he demonstrated his commitment to nuclear power by announcing his approval of an $8 billion loan guarantee to pave the way for construction of the first new US nuclear power plant in nearly 30 years. Then in 2012, his first post-Fukishima state-of-the-union address, Obama said that America needs "an all-out, all-of-the-above strategy that develops every available source of American energy," yet pointedly omitted any mention of nuclear power. But in February 2014, Energy secretary Ernest Moniz announced $6.5 billion in federal loan guarantees to enable construction of two new nuclear reactors, the first in the US since 1996.

According to the Union of Concerned Scientists in March 2013, over one-third of U.S. nuclear power plants suffered safety-related incidents over the past three years, and nuclear regulators and plant operators need to improve inspections to prevent such events.

Pandora's Promise is a 2013 documentary film, directed by Robert Stone. It presents an argument that nuclear energy, typically feared by environmentalists, is the only feasible way of meeting humanity's growing need for energy while also addressing the serious problem of climate change. The movie features several notable individuals (some of whom were once vehemently opposed to nuclear power, but who now speak in support of it), including: Stewart Brand, Gwyneth Cravens, Mark Lynas, Richard Rhodes and Michael Shellenberger. Anti-nuclear advocate Helen Caldicott appears briefly.

As of 2014, the U.S. nuclear industry has begun a new lobbying effort, hiring three former senators—Evan Bayh, a Democrat; Judd Gregg, a Republican; and Spencer Abraham, a Republican—as well as William M. Daley, a former staffer to President Obama. The initiative, called Nuclear Matters, had begun a newspaper advertising campaign.

Founder of the Energy Impact Center, a research institute analyzing solutions towards net negative carbon by 2040, Bret Kugelmass believes that “even if we achieved net zero new emissions globally, we’d continue to add extra heat at the same rate we are adding it today,” explaining that we need to remove the already existent carbon dioxide in our atmosphere in order to reverse climate change, not just stop the generation of new emissions. Research efforts conducted by the Energy Impact Center have concluded that nuclear energy is the only energy source that is capable of becoming net-negative and effectively solving global warming.

=== Public opinion ===
The Gallup organization, which has periodically polled U.S. public opinion on nuclear power since 1994, found in March 2016 that, for the first time, a majority (54%) opposed nuclear power, versus 44% in favor. In polls from 2004 through 2015, a majority had supported nuclear power. Support peaked at 62% in 2010.

According to a CBS News poll, what had been growing acceptance of nuclear power in the United States was eroded sharply following the 2011 Japanese nuclear accidents, with support for building nuclear power plants in the US dropping slightly lower than it was immediately after the Three Mile Island accident in 1979. Only 43% of those polled after the Fukushima nuclear emergency said they would approve building new power plants in the US. A Washington Post–ABC poll conducted in April 2011 found that 64% of Americans opposed the construction of new nuclear reactors. A survey sponsored by the Nuclear Energy Institute, conducted in September 2011, found that "62 percent of respondents said they favor the use of nuclear energy as one of the ways to provide electricity in the United States, with 35 percent opposed".

According to a 2012 Pew Research Center poll, 44% of Americans favored and 49% opposed the promotion of increased use of nuclear power.

A January 2014 Rasmussen poll found likely US voters split nearly evenly on whether to build more nuclear power plants, 39% in favor, versus 37% opposed, with an error margin of 3%.

Knowledge and familiarity of nuclear power are generally associated with higher support for the technology. A study conducted by Ann Bisconti shows that those who feel more educated about nuclear power also have a more positive opinion towards it; in addition, people who live near nuclear power plants also tend to be largely more in support of nuclear power than the general public.

Decreasing public support is seen as one of the causes for the premature closure of many nuclear power plants in the United States.

However, U.S. public support has been steadily increasing from 2016 to 2025, with a majority (51%) once again favoring nuclear energy use in 2022, and as of 2025 has gone up to a near record high of 61% in favor.

== Economics ==
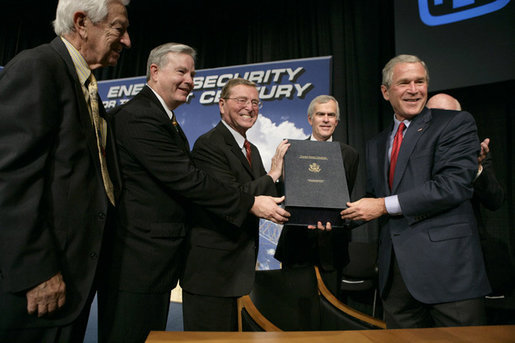
George W. Bush signing the Energy Policy Act of 2005, which was designed to promote US nuclear reactor construction, through incentives and subsidies, including cost-overrun support up to a total of $2 billion for six new nuclear plants.

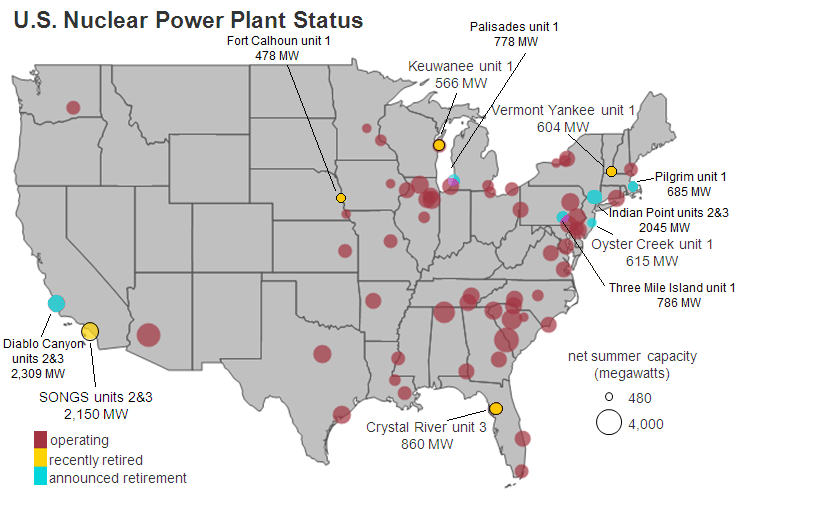
US nuclear power plants, highlighting recently and soon-to-be retired plants, as of 2018 (US EIA)

The low price of natural gas in the United States since 2008 has spurred construction of gas-fired power plants as an alternative to nuclear plants. In August 2011, the head of America's largest nuclear utility said that this was not the time to build new nuclear plants, not because of political opposition or the threat of cost overruns, but because of the low price of natural gas. John Rowe, head of Exelon, said “Shale [gas] is good for the country, bad for new nuclear development".

In 2013, four older reactors were permanently closed: San Onofre 2 and 3 in California, Crystal River 3 in Florida, and Kewaunee in Wisconsin. In December 2014, Vermont Yankee was closed by the parent corporation for economic reasons. Indian Point Energy Center, 30 miles from New York City, was closed on April 30, 2020 (Unit 2) and April 30, 2021 (Unit 3).

The additional cancellation of five large reactor upgrades (Prairie Island, 1 reactor; LaSalle, 2 reactors; and Limerick, 2 reactors), four by the largest nuclear company in the US, suggest that the nuclear industry faces "a broad range of operational and economic problems".

In July 2013, economist Mark Cooper named some nuclear power plants that face particularly intense challenges to their continued operation. Cooper said that the lesson for policy makers and economists is clear: "nuclear reactors are simply not competitive".

In December 2010, The Economist reported that the demand for nuclear power was softening in America. In recent years, utilities have shown an interest in about 30 new reactors, but the number with any serious prospect of being built as of the end of 2010 was about a dozen, as some companies had withdrawn their applications for licenses to build. Exelon has withdrawn its application for a license for a twin-unit nuclear plant in Victoria County, Texas, citing lower electricity demand projections. The decision has left the country's largest nuclear operator without a direct role in what the nuclear industry hopes is a nuclear renaissance. Ground has been broken on two new nuclear plants with a total of four reactors. The Obama administration was seeking the expansion of a loan guarantee program but as of December 2010 had been unable to commit all the loan guarantee money already approved by Congress. Since talk a few years ago of a “nuclear renaissance”, natural gas prices have fallen and old reactors are getting license extensions. The only reactor to finish construction after 1996 was at Watts Bar, Tennessee. It is an old unit, begun in 1973, whose construction was suspended in 1988, and was resumed in 2007. It became operational in October 2016. Of the 100 reactors operating in the U.S., ground was broken on all of them in 1974 or earlier.

In August 2012, Exelon stated that economic and market conditions, especially low natural gas prices, made the "construction of new merchant nuclear power plants in competitive markets uneconomical now and for the foreseeable future". In early 2013, UBS noted that some smaller reactors operating in deregulated markets may become uneconomic to operate and maintain, due to competition from generators using low priced natural gas, and may be retired early. The 556 MWe Kewaunee Power Station is being closed 20 years before license expiry for these economic reasons. In February 2014, the Financial Times identified Pilgrim, Indian Point, Clinton, and Quad Cities power stations as potentially at risk of premature closure for economic reasons.

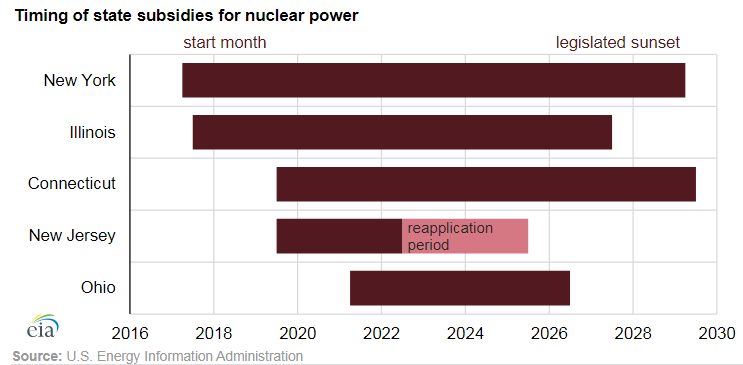
Timeline of state subsidies for nuclear power as of 2019

As of 2017, the U.S. shale gas boom has lowered electricity generation costs placing severe pressure on the economics of operating older existing nuclear power plants. Analysis by Bloomberg shows that over half of U.S. nuclear plants are running at a loss. The Nuclear Energy Institute has estimated that 15 to 20 reactors are at risk of early closure for economic reasons. Nuclear operators in Illinois and New York have obtained financial support from regulators, and operators in Connecticut, New Jersey, Ohio and Pennsylvania are seeking similar support. Some non-nuclear power generating companies have filed unfair competition lawsuits against these subsidies, and have raised the issue with the Federal Energy Regulatory Commission.

== Statistics ==
United States nuclear generation (GWh)
Year	Total	% of total	Jan	Feb	Mar	Apr	May	Jun	Jul	Aug	Sep	Oct	Nov	Dec
2001	768,826	20.58%	68,707	61,272	62,141	56,003	61,512	68,023	69,166	68,389	63,378	60,461	62,342	67,431
2002	780,064	20.22%	70,926	61,658	63,041	58,437	63,032	66,372	70,421	70,778	64,481	60,493	61,520	68,905
2003	763,733	19.67%	69,211	60,942	59,933	56,776	62,202	64,181	69,653	69,024	63,584	60,016	59,600	68,612
2004	788,528	19.86%	70,806	64,102	63,285	58,620	64,917	67,734	71,975	71,068	65,932	62,530	58,941	68,617
2005	781,986	19.28%	69,828	60,947	61,539	55,484	62,970	66,144	71,070	71,382	66,739	61,236	62,913	71,735
2006	787,219	19.37%	71,912	62,616	63,721	57,567	62,776	68,391	72,186	72,016	66,642	57,509	61,392	70,490
2007	806,425	19.4%	74,006	65,225	64,305	57,301	65,025	68,923	72,739	72,751	67,579	61,690	64,899	71,983
2008	806,208	19.57%	70,735	65,130	64,716	57,333	64,826	70,319	74,318	72,617	67,054	62,820	63,408	72,931
2009	798,855	20.22%	74,102	64,227	67,241	59,408	65,395	69,735	72,949	72,245	65,752	58,021	59,069	70,710
2010	806,968	19.56%	72,569	65,245	64,635	57,611	66,658	68,301	71,913	71,574	69,371	62,751	62,655	73,683
2011	790,204	19.27%	72,743	64,789	65,662	54,547	57,013	65,270	72,345	71,339	66,849	63,337	64,474	71,837
2012	769,331	19.01%	72,381	63,847	61,729	55,871	62,081	65,140	69,129	69,602	64,511	59,743	56,713	68,584
2013	789,016	19.41%	71,406	61,483	62,947	56,767	62,848	66,430	70,539	71,344	65,799	63,184	64,975	71,294
2014	797,166	19.47%	73,163	62,639	62,397	56,385	62,947	68,138	71,940	71,129	67,535	62,391	65,140	73,363
2015	797,178	19.54%	74,270	63,461	64,547	59,784	65,827	68,516	71,412	72,415	66,476	60,571	60,264	69,634
2016	805,694	19.76%	72,525	65,638	66,149	62,732	66,576	67,175	70,349	71,526	65,448	60,733	65,179	71,662
2017	804,950	19.95%	73,121	63,560	65,093	56,743	61,313	67,011	71,314	72,384	68,098	65,995	66,618	73,700
2018	807,084	19.3%	74,649	64,790	67,033	59,133	67,320	69,688	72,456	72,282	64,725	59,397	63,954	71,657
2019	809,409	19.6%	73,701	64,715	65,080	60,581	67,124	68,805	72,199	71,911	66,064	62,033	64,125	73,074
2020	789,879	19.7%	74,170	65,911	63,997	59,170	64,338	67,205	69,385	68,982	65,727	59,362	61,760	69,871
2021	779,645	18.97%	71,732	62,954	63,708	57,092	63,394	66,070	68,832	69,471	64,484	56,945	62,749	70,720
2022	771,537	18.24%	70,577	61,852	63,154	55,290	63,382	65,663	68,857	68,897	63,733	58,945	62,041	69,094
2023	775,347	18.56%	70,870	60,807	62,820	56,662	61,473	64,965	69,888	69,744	65,560	61,403	62,258	68,898
2024	781,979	18.17%	69,080	64,584	63,346	57,326	64,973	68,192	69,885	69,760	62,660	58,437	61,904	71,200
2025	784,781	17.72%	71,739	61,829	62,457	57,893	62,145	66,222	70,781	70,705	65,458	59,222	63,809	72,521
2026	320,105	18.02%	73,251	62,384	62,096	57,373	65,001							
Last entry, % of total			18.33%	18.2%	17.8%	17.35%	18.33%	16.85%	15.84%	16.84%	17.78%	17.14%	19.05%	18.97%

== See also ==
- High-level radioactive waste management
- Nuclear energy policy of the United States
- Energy policy of the United States
- List of nuclear reactors
- List of largest power stations in the United States
- List of the largest nuclear power stations in the United States
- Nuclear energy policy
- Nuclear reactor accidents in the United States
- List of nuclear whistleblowers
- United States-India Peaceful Atomic Energy Cooperation Act
- United States-Japan Joint Nuclear Energy Action Plan
