= Central Hudson =

Central Hudson may refer to:

- Central Hudson Gas & Electric Corp. v. Public Service Commission, a 1980 US Supreme Court case
- Central Hudson Energy Group, parent company of Central Hudson Gas & Electric, commonly known as Central Hudson
- The Mid-Hudson region of the Hudson Valley
- The central portion of the Hudson River
