= Yankee Rowe Nuclear Power Station =

Decommissioned nuclear power plant in Massachusetts

Coordinates: 42°43′40.22″N 72°55′44.79″W

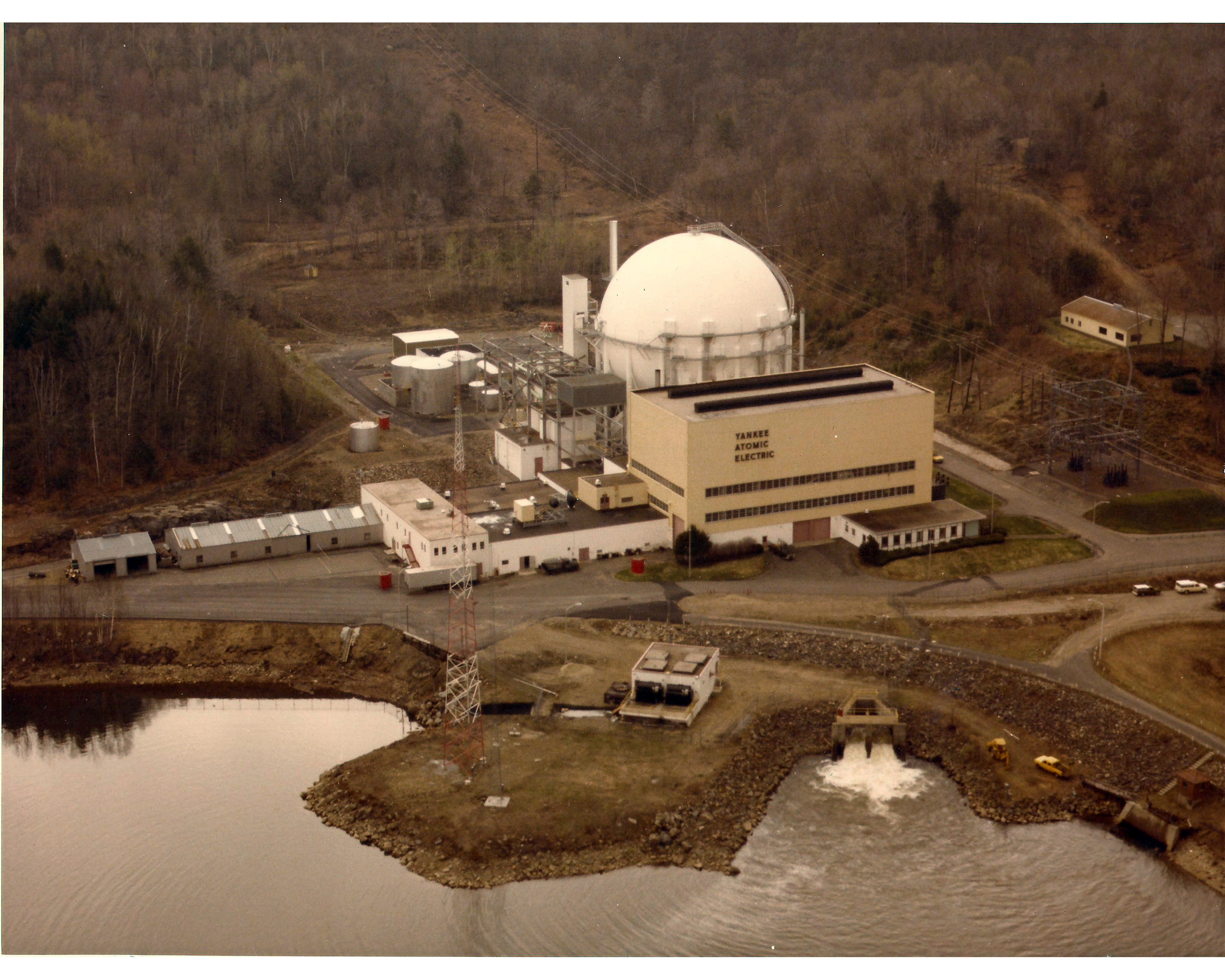
Yankee Rowe Nuclear Power Station

Yankee Rowe Nuclear Power Station was a nuclear power plant in Rowe, Massachusetts, located on the Deerfield River in the town of Rowe in western Massachusetts. Its 180 MWe pressurized water reactor operated from 1961 to 1991. It produced electricity for New England consumers. The site is referred to as "Yankee-Rowe" or simply "Rowe", to avoid confusion with Vermont Yankee, another nuclear power station located in nearby Vernon, Vermont. The decommissioning of the site was completed in 2007.

== Firsts ==
The first power plant in this area was W.T. Turner's Hydro-electric production service to the town of Charlemont. Yankee atomic is the distant second as far as local heritage and historical significance. Yankee Nuclear Power Station (YNPS) was the third commercial nuclear power plant built in the United States and the first built in New England. According to several sources Yankee Rowe was the first commercial pressurized water reactor operating in the United States. This view discounts the government-sponsored Shippingport Atomic Power Station, which was not built on a commercial basis and relied on several technologies that would not be embraced by the commercial operators. The Dresden Generating Station, a commercial boiling water reactor (BWR), slightly preceded the opening of Yankee Rowe in 1960. US government sources place the first self-sustaining nuclear reaction at Dresden-1 on 15 October 1959 and the first one at Yankee Rowe on 19 August 1960. Yankee Rowe began commercial operation in 1961.

It has also been named as the first large-scale nuclear unit in the United States.

== Construction ==
Yankee Atomic Electric Company (YAEC) was incorporated in Massachusetts in 1954. YAEC was sponsored by ten New England utilities for the purpose of constructing and operating New England's first nuclear power plant, the Yankee Nuclear Power Station. Owners and ownership percentage:

- New England Power Company 34.5%
- Connecticut Light and Power Company 24.5%
- Boston Edison Company 9.5%
- Central Maine Power Company 9.5%
- Public Service Company of New Hampshire 7.0%
- Western Massachusetts Electric Company 7.0%
- Central Vermont Public Service Corporation 3.5%
- Commonwealth Electric Company 2.5%
- Cambridge Electric Light Company 2.0%

Construction of the plant was completed in 1960 at a cost of $39 million, equal to $424,437,570 today. The capital cost was $45 million against an estimated cost of $57 million, according to the engineering consultant Kenneth Nichols, who had been deputy to Leslie Groves on the Manhattan Project. He wrote that the Connecticut Yankee and Yankee Rowe nuclear power plants were considered "experimental" and were not expected to be competitive with coal and oil, they "became competitive because of inflation ... and the large increase in price of coal and oil." When the Yankee Rowe plant was announced Admiral Hyman Rickover called him and said the "low cost figure" of $57 million was "impossible to achieve … and I hate to see you ruin your reputation." But Nichols replied that many items were on fixed prices and many of the conventional components would be to normal utility standards to save money without sacrificing safety or reliability.

During its 32-year operating history, the Yankee plant generated over 34 billion kilowatt-hours of electricity, and had a lifetime capacity factor of 74%.

== Decommissioning ==
Yankee Rowe was shut down prematurely due to reactor pressure vessel embrittlement concerns. This safety factor is now scrutinized in all plants (see ductility). In August 2007, the Nuclear Regulatory Commission declared the decommissioning of Yankee Rowe completed.

In its 2004 License Termination Plan, Yankee Atomic Electric Company wrote that between 1992 and 2003 already $348 million was spent on decommissioning and the estimated costs for further decommissioning, contingency and spent fuel storage were about $390 million. In total, the cost for decommissioning of the plant was $608 million, up from an initial estimate of $368 million.

=== Nuclear waste disposal ===
While most of the grounds were released as safe, a cask storage facility remained under NRC supervision. Spent nuclear fuel and "Greater Than Class C" (GTCC) waste were stored in the newly built on-site dry cask "Independent Spent Fuel Storage Installation" (ISFSI) by June 2003. This would be turned over to the U.S. Department of Energy (DOE) in 2022.

The spent fuel storage facility takes up about 80 acres and will be operated by "Yankee Atomic". The waste is stored in 15 canisters of spent fuel and one container with GTCC. The GTCC includes the reactor's control rods and other removed radioactive elements. It is considered safe after 500 years. The spent fuel is expected to be safe within 100 years. The nuclear waste is contained in dry casks made of 21 inches of reinforced concrete, surrounding a 3 1/2-inch-thick steel liner, with each cask weighing 100 tons. The 16 casks sit on a 3-foot-thick concrete pad. It will remain at the site until DOE has completed a permanent storage facility for spent nuclear reactor fuel and the spent fuel stored at Rowe can be transferred to such a future federal facility.

== See also ==
- Lelan Sillin, Jr.
- New England Coalition
- Nuclear power in the United States
