= Lelan Sillin Jr. =

American businessman

Lelan F. Sillin Jr. (April 19, 1918 – January 3, 1997) was a pioneer in the nuclear power industry, an advocate of nuclear safety, and chairman and chief executive of Northeast Utilities. An early proponent of nuclear power, he was nevertheless critical of some nuclear operators who failed to strive for excellence in their work. Trained as an attorney, he first rose from general counsel to president and chief executive of Central Hudson Gas and Electric before ascending to the top of Northeast, Connecticut's largest public utility, a position he held from 1970 to 1983. He chaired the "Sillin Report", a 1986 analysis of the nuclear power industry, in which he chided some utility companies for simply meeting rather than exceeding regulatory requirements.

== Biography ==
Lelan Sillin was born in Tampa, Florida, on April 19, 1918. He graduated from the University of Michigan in 1940 and graduated from the University of Michigan Law School in 1942. During World War II he served in the United States Marine Corps in the South Pacific until 1945. He started his business career as a corporate attorney with the New York law firm of Gould & Wilkie, where he was general counsel for Central Hudson Gas and Electric in Poughkeepsie, New York. He later rose to become Central Hudson's president, and its chief executive in 1964. Forsaking law, he remained in the utilities industry, joining Northeast Utilities, a utility holding company, as president in 1968. Two years later he was named chairman and chief executive.

At the time he took charge of Northeast, the New England region's electricity prices were higher than the national average, and Sillin viewed nuclear power as the least expensive, most efficient, and cleanest energy option. Skyrocketing petroleum prices due to 1970s energy crises just reinforced this view. In addition to four "Yankee" nuclear plants already built by the individual firms that joined to become Northeast Utilities in 1966—"Connecticut", "Maine", "Vermont", and "Rowe"—the firm added two "Millstone" plants to its generation capacity during that decade.

Sillin's middle years with the company did not go easily. In addition to the Middle East oil embargoes of 1973 and 1979, escalating inflation, rising construction costs, annual tussles with the regulatory boards of the two most important states Northeast served - Connecticut and Massachusetts, and heavy borrowing, began eroding Northeast Utility's financial viability. Company fortunes did not begin to recover until Sillin recruited and hired his own replacement, William B. Ellis, and retired as chairman and chief executive in 1983. A number of factors, including resetting expectations by downsizing company growth predictions and annual return projections, a more amicable relationship with regulators, improved operating margins, and the third "Millstone" plant coming online, all contributed to the turnaround.

== Legacy ==
Sillin was regarded by friend and foe "as frank and forthright and someone who held a genuine concern for the customers he served."

Shortly into his role at the top of Northeast Utilities Sillin was granted the honor of delivering the 1970 installment of the prestigious Charles P. Steinmetz Memorial Lecture at Union College.

Although Sillin helped make Northeast Utilities the most nuclear-powered utility in the nation during his tenure, he saw himself as an energy pragmatist. In a 1979 interview he bristled: "I don't like being classed as a nuclear proponent. I'm a utility man. As soon as we find a better technology, we'll go with it."

Sillin was an early advocate of nuclear power but criticized some nuclear operators for complacency. In a 1986 analysis on the nuclear power industry called the "Sillin Report," he chided utilities that simply met regulatory requirements "instead of striving for excellence."

== Personal life ==
Sillin was married to Joan Outhwaite Sillin, with whom he had four sons, Lelan III of Syracuse, New York; John, of Potomac, Maryland; Andrew, of New Paltz, New York, and William of Sunderland, Massachusetts.

Mr. Sillin was a trustee at Wesleyan University in Middletown, Connecticut, and served on the board of the Florence Griswold Museum in Old Lyme.

He died in a traffic accident in Old Lyme at 78 on January 3, 1997.
