= Connecticut Yankee Nuclear Power Plant =

US nuclear power plant (1968–2004)

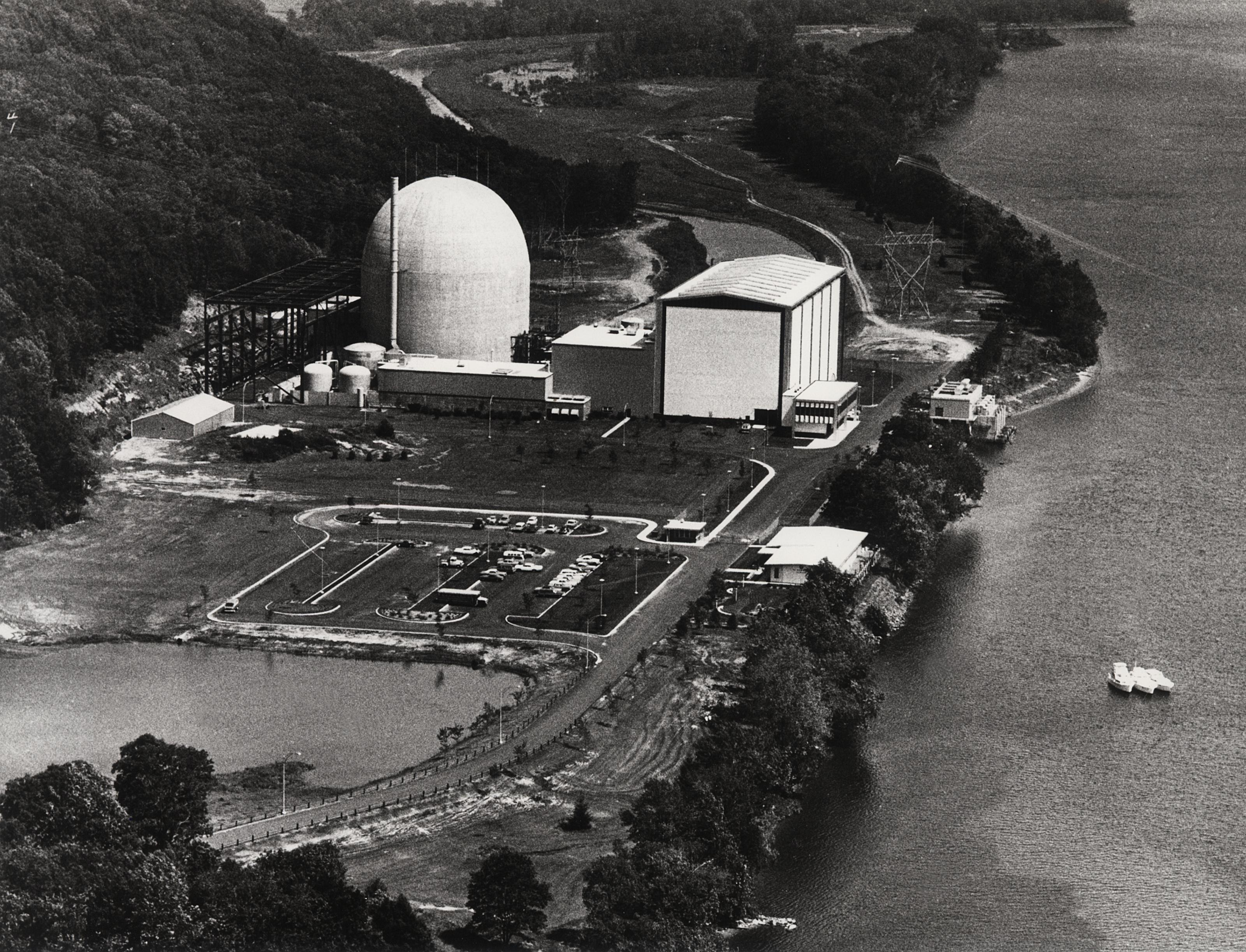
- Connecticut Yankee Nuclear Power Plant
- Official name: Haddam Neck Nuclear Power Plant
- Country: United States
- Location: Haddam, Middlesex County, Connecticut
- Coordinates: 41°28′56″N 72°29′54″W
- Status: Decommissioned
- Construction began: May 1, 1964
- Commission date: January 1, 1968
- Decommission date: December 5, 1996
- Owner: Connecticut Yankee Atomic Power Company
- Operator: Connecticut Yankee Atomic Power Company

Nuclear power station
- Reactor type: PWR
- Reactor supplier: Westinghouse
- Cooling source: Connecticut River
- Thermal capacity: 1 × 1825 MW_{th}

Power generation
- Units decommissioned: 1 × 560 MW
- Capacity factor: 73.5% (lifetime)
- Annual net output: 3928.5 GWh per year 110,000 GWh lifetime

External links
- Website: Connecticut Yankee
- Commons: Related media on Commons

Connecticut Yankee Nuclear Power Plant (CY) was a nuclear power plant located in Haddam Neck, Connecticut. The power plant was on Connecticut River near the East Haddam Swing Bridge. The plant was commissioned in 1968, ceased electricity production in 1996, and was decommissioned by 2004. The reason for the closure was because operation of the nuclear power station was no longer cost effective.

The plant was a prototype for the Westinghouse 4-loop design (usually 1150 MWe), with a capacity of 582MWe. Demolition of the containment dome was completed the week of July 17, 2006.

Kenneth Nichols, the deputy to Leslie Groves on the Manhattan Project, was a consultant for the Connecticut Yankee and Yankee Rowe nuclear power plants. He said that while the plants were considered "experimental" and were not expected to be competitive with coal and oil, they "became competitive because of inflation … and the large increase in price of coal and oil." The Connecticut Yankee plant was estimated to cost $100 million.

All original buildings were removed during decommissioning and the former plant site, according to federal and state environmental authorities, has been fully remediated and ready for any use including farming. Much of this work was completed by the Connecticut based Manafort Brothers Incorporated.

Due to the failure of the US Department of Energy to develop a national nuclear waste storage facility, all of the spent fuel used by the reactor remains at the site in an Independent Spent Fuel Storage Installation (ISFSI). There are a total of 43 dry storage casks, 40 of which contain spent nuclear fuel while the other 3 contain reactor components classified as high-level radioactive waste.

== See also ==
- Lelan Sillin, Jr.
