= Central Hudson Energy Group =

Utility company in New York State, U.S.

- Founded: 1925; 101 years ago
- Headquarters: Poughkeepsie, New York
- Area served: New York
- Revenue: $711,895,000 (2020)
- Number of employees: 1,061
- Parent: Fortis Inc.
- Website: centralhudson.com

CH Energy Group, Inc. is most known for its subsidiary Central Hudson Gas & Electric, commonly known as Central Hudson. Central Hudson Gas & Electric delivers electricity and natural gas to residents of a 2,600-square-mile (6,700 km^{2}) service territory that extends north from the suburbs of metropolitan New York City to the Capital District at Albany. Central Hudson is headquartered in Poughkeepsie, New York.

It is a subsidiary of Fortis Inc., a diversified electric utility holding company based in St. John's, Newfoundland and Labrador, Canada.

== History ==
Central Hudson Gas & Electric Corporation was officially formed in 1925 after a merger of 80-plus independent electric and gas companies in the state of New York.

From 1964 to 1968, the CEO of Central Hudson was Lelan Sillin, Jr.

During the 1980s, the company had electrical cables running over what later became the Walkway over the Hudson.

In 2000, CH Energy Group, Inc. was formed as a parent organization of Central Hudson Gas & Electric Corporation and a family of subsidiaries known as Central Hudson Enterprises Corporation (CHEC). CHEC is a non-regulatory subsidiary, composed primarily of Griffith Energy Services, which supplies petroleum products and related services to approximately 56,000 customers in the Mid Atlantic Region. It was sold by Central Hudson in 2014.

In 2013, Fortis Inc. acquired CH Energy Group for US$1.5 billion which included the assumption of approximately US$500 million of debt.

== Operations ==
Central Hudson is the only electricity and natural gas delivery provider for the 300,000 electric and 78,000 natural gas customers residing in their 2,600-square-mile (6,700 km^{2}) service territory. New York is an open market state for electricity; customers can choose who buys and resells their supply of energy since utilities are generally not permitted to operate the power plants that provide electricity in the state of New York; however, Central Hudson must be contracted to deliver the energy. Central Hudson's delivery rate is fixed and must be approved by a regulatory review and approval process involving the Public Service Commission. In 2020, electric and gas revenue for the year was $711,895,000.

=== Criticism ===
In recent years, Central Hudson has faced public backlash in Ulster County, with the retired, young parents, and small business owners complaining about arbitrary rate increases.

On 4 February 2025, the City of Kingston passed a municipal resolution in favor of the Hudson Valley Power Authority Act.

In 2026, a bill was re-introduced by State Senator Michelle Hinchey to "dissolve Central Hudson Gas & Electric and replace it with a publicly controlled utility serving the Hudson Valley."
