= List of whistleblowers =

This list of major whistleblowers from various countries. The individuals below brought attention to abuses by the government or large corporations. Many of these whistleblowers were fired from their jobs or prosecuted in the process of shining light on their issue of concern. This lists whistleblowers associated with events that were sufficiently notable to merit a Wikipedia article about the whistleblower or the event, and "Year" is the year of the event. This list is not exhaustive.

== Before 1960 ==
Year	Image	Name	Organization	Action
1515–52		Bartolomé de las Casas	Spanish slave plantations in the New World	In 1515, he advocated, before King Charles V, Holy Roman Emperor, on behalf of rights for the natives. In his early writings, he advocated the use of African slaves instead of natives in the West-Indian colonies. Later in life, he came to see all forms of slavery as equally wrong.
1777		Samuel Shaw	United States Continental Navy	Along with Third Lieutenant Richard Marven, midshipman Shaw was a key figure in the passage of the first whistleblower law passed in the United States by the Continental Congress. During the Revolutionary War, the two naval officers blew the whistle on the torturing of British POWs by Commodore Esek Hopkins, the commander-in-chief of the Continental Navy. The Continental Congress enacted the whistleblower protection law on July 30, 1778, by a unanimous vote. In addition, it declared that the United States would defend the two against a libel suit filed against them by Hopkins.
1864		Silas Soule	United States Army	A Captain in the U.S. Army, Soule was in command of Company D, 1st Colorado Cavalry, which was present at Sand Creek on November 29, 1864, when he refused an order for his men to join the Sand Creek massacre in slaughtering Indian women, children, and elderly men. Soule quickly reported the facts of the massacre to another officer, who alerted the federal government. During the subsequent Congressional inquiry, Soule testified against the massacre's commanding officer, John Chivington. Soon afterward, Soule was murdered, possibly in retaliation. Dying at age 26, Soule is remembered as having led a life of "moral courage" at great personal risk.
1893		Edmund Dene Morel	Congo Free State	English shipping clerk turned journalist who reported on the atrocities in the Congo Free State in Africa and became an anti-slavery campaigner. His revelations led to a strong campaign against Belgian King Leopold II's autocratic regime in his African territory, where the rubber plantations brutally exploited slave labor.
1930		Boris Bazhanov	CPSU Secretariat	Stalin's secretary, who fled abroad in 1928, and while living in the Western countries, exposed many secrets concerning Stalin's rise to power and the Stalin regime. The first book of his memoirs was published in Paris in 1930.
1931		Herbert Yardley	United States Cipher Bureau	Cryptologist and Head of the Cipher Bureau, the first U.S. SIGINT agency better known as "The Black Chamber", who exposed the inner workings of the organization and its surveillance policies in his eponymous 1931 book, The American Black Chamber, after the United States Department of State withdrew funding from the organization's activities in 1929, citing ethical concerns. However, while "The Black Chamber" ceased operations following the withdrawal of funding, the publication of Yardley's book two years later and its resultant controversy in government circles caused the amendment of the Espionage Act of 1917 to prohibit the disclosure of foreign code or any communication transmitted through code. Though Yardley remains a controversial figure in the intelligence community, he was honored by the National Security Agency in 1999.
1933		Smedley Butler	United States Marine Corps	Retired U.S. Marines Corps Major General, a two-time recipient of the Medal of Honor, who alleged to the McCormack-Dickstein Committee in the U.S. House of Representatives that business leaders had plotted a fascist coup d'état against the Franklin D. Roosevelt administration in what became known as the Business Plot. In his book War Is a Racket, Butler listed well-known U.S. military operations that he alleged were not about protecting democracy as was told to the public but in furthering the business interests of U.S. banks and corporations.
1933/ 1934		Herbert von Bose	Schutzstaffel	Press Chief of Adolf Hitler's conservative Vice-Chancellor Franz von Papen. He used his position inside the government apparatus to pass on information about secret atrocities and wrongdoings committed by the Nazi Government and Part organizations (especially the SA and SS) to the foreign press - especially to Claud Cockburn, editor of the London-based muckraking journal The Week - to alarm the world public about those goings-on. On June 30, 1934 during Night of the Long Knives he was murdered by a squad of SS men dispatched to his office by Heinrich Himmler, who shot him in the back of the head. Jessica Mitford dubbed him "Deep Throat of the Third Reich"
1942		Jan Karski	Polish Home Army	Polish resistance fighter, who during World War II twice visited the Warsaw ghetto, and met with United States president Franklin Delano Roosevelt, with the UK Foreign Secretary, and with the Polish shadow government in London, to report what he had witnessed concerning conditions for Jewish people, and the extermination camps. His report was not taken seriously by any authority.

== 1960s–1970s ==
Year	Image	Name	Organization	Action
1963		John Paul Vann	United States Army	American colonel, who, during the Vietnam War, reported to his superiors that American policy and tactics were seriously flawed, and later went to the media with his concerns. Vann was asked to resign from his commission and did so, but later returned to Vietnam.
1965		Meier 19	Swiss Police	
1966		Peter Buxtun	United States Public Health Service	Exposed the Tuskegee Syphilis Experiment.
1967		John White	United States Navy	White, a former U.S. Navy officer, wrote a letter to the editor of the New Haven (Conn.) Register asserting that U.S. President Lyndon Johnson provided false information to Congress in 1964 about alleged attacks on U.S. naval ships by the North Vietnamese that led to the passage of the Gulf of Tonkin Resolution. The resolution was used to justify U.S. entry into the Vietnam War. He testified privately in front of Congress in 1968. White continued his whistleblowing activities with an appearance in the 1968 documentary In the Year of the Pig. In 2014, he published his account of the 1964 incident, The Gulf of Tonkin Events: Fifty Years Later (A Footnote to the History of the Vietnam War).
1971		Daniel Ellsberg	United States State Department	Ellsberg was a former RAND Corp. military analyst who, along with Anthony Russo, leaked the Pentagon Papers, a secret account of the Vietnam War, to The New York Times. The Pentagon Papers revealed endemic practices of deception by previous administrations and contributed to the erosion of public support for the war. The release triggered a legal case concerning government efforts to prevent the publication of classified information that was heard by the U.S. Supreme Court (New York Times Co. v. United States). Ellsberg was the subject of retaliation by the Nixon Administration.
1971		Frank Serpico	New York Police Department	Former New York City police officer who reported several of his fellow officers for bribery and related charges in front of the Knapp Commission probing police corruption in the NYPD. Serpico was the first police officer in the history of the NYPD to step forward to report and subsequently testify openly about widespread, systemic corruption payoffs amounting to millions of dollars. The 1973 film Serpico is an account of his story.
1971		Perry Fellwock	National Security Agency	Former NSA analyst who revealed the existence of the NSA and its worldwide covert surveillance network in Ramparts magazine in 1971. Because of the Fellwock revelations, the U.S. Senate Church Committee introduced successful legislation to stop NSA spying on American citizens. Fellwock was motivated by Daniel Ellsberg's release of the Pentagon Papers.
1971		Vladimir Bukovsky	Soviet abuse of psychiatry	In the Soviet Union, during the leadership of general secretary Leonid Brezhnev, psychiatry was used as a tool to eliminate political dissidents. In 1971, Vladimir Bukovsky smuggled to the West a file of 150 pages documenting the political abuse of psychiatry, which he sent to The Times. The documents were photocopies of forensic reports on prominent Soviet dissidents. In January 1972, Bukovsky was convicted of spreading anti-Soviet propaganda under Criminal Code, mainly on the ground that he had, with anti-Soviet intention, circulated false reports about political dissenters confined in mental hospitals. Political abuse of psychiatry in the Soviet Union was denounced in the course of the Congresses of the World Psychiatric Association in Mexico City (1971), Hawaii (1977), Vienna (1983) and Athens (1989).
1972		Martha Mitchell	Committee for the Re-Election of the President (CRP)	Mitchell learned key details of the Watergate scandal by eavesdropping on her then-husband John N. Mitchell and snooping through documents he brought to their home. She went on to share what she learned with the press and was subsequently kidnapped and held captive for several days in an attempt to keep her quiet. The Nixon campaign underwent a campaign to discredit Mitchell as "crazy" and having a drinking problem. James W. McCord Jr., who was convicted in the scandal, later corroborated Mitchell's story. The Martha Mitchell effect is named for her experiences. In 1973, she provided testimony in the Democratic Party's civil suit against the CRP.
1972		W. Mark Felt	Federal Bureau of Investigation	Known only as Deep Throat until 2005, Felt was associate director of the FBI, the number-two job in the Bureau, when he leaked information about President Richard Nixon's involvement in the Watergate scandal. The scandal would eventually lead to the resignation of the president, and prison terms for White House Chief of Staff H. R. Haldeman and presidential adviser John Ehrlichman.
1973		Stanley Adams	Hoffmann-LaRoche	A senior executive at Swiss pharmaceutical company Hoffman-LaRoche, Adams supplied evidence to European Economic Community regulators on the company's price fixing in the international vitamin market. The EEC revealed his name during the resulting investigation and Adams was arrested for industrial espionage by the Swiss government and spent six months in jail. He fought for ten years to clear his name and receive compensation from the EEC.
1973		A. Ernest Fitzgerald	United States Department of Defense	U.S. Air Force auditor who exposed to Congress a $2 billion cost overrun associated with Lockheed's C-5A cargo plane. Fitzgerald retired from the Defense Department in 2006.
1973		Henri Pezerat	French National Centre for Scientific Research	Henri Pezerat, working on the Jussieu Campus, detected asbestos fibers falling from the ceiling and created a committee to study and inform people about the dangers of asbestos.
1974		Karen Silkwood	Kerr-McGee	There have been a number of nuclear power whistleblowers who have identified safety concerns at nuclear power plants. The first prominent nuclear power whistleblower was Karen Silkwood, who worked as a chemical technician at a Kerr-McGee nuclear plant. Silkwood became an activist in the Oil, Chemical and Atomic Workers International Union to protest health and safety issues. In 1974, she testified to the United States Atomic Energy Commission about her concerns. The 1983 film Silkwood is an account of this story.
1976		Gregory C. Minor, Richard B. Hubbard, and Dale G. Bridenbaugh	General Electric	Nuclear power whistleblowers. On February 2, 1976, Gregory C. Minor, Richard B. Hubbard, and Dale G. Bridenbaugh (known as the GE Three) "blew the whistle" on safety problems at nuclear power plants, and their action has been called "an exemplary instance of whistleblowing". The three engineers gained the attention of journalists and their disclosures about the threats of nuclear power had a significant impact. They timed their statements to coincide with their resignations from responsible positions in General Electric's nuclear energy division and later established themselves as consultants on the nuclear power industry for state governments, federal agencies, and overseas governments. The consulting firm they formed, MHB Technical Associates, was the technical advisor for the movie, The China Syndrome. The three engineers participated in Congressional hearings which their disclosures precipitated.
1977		Frank Snepp	Central Intelligence Agency	CIA analyst at the US Embassy, Saigon who published Decent Interval in 1977 about Operation Frequent Wind and the failures of the CIA and other American entities to properly prepare for the Fall of Saigon. Although he redacted all names, methods, and sources from the book, after it was published, CIA Director Stansfield Turner had Snepp successfully prosecuted for breach of contract for violating his non-disclosure agreement. Snepp lost all income, including royalties, from publication of the book, a verdict upheld by the U.S. Supreme Court.

== 1980s ==
Year	Image	Name	Organization	Action
1981		Ralph McGehee	Central Intelligence Agency (CIA)	Ralph Walter McGehee (born 1928) served for 25 years in American intelligence, being a former case officer of the Central Intelligence Agency (CIA). From 1953 to 1972, his assignments were in East Asia and Southeast Asia, where he held administrative posts. After leaving the Central Intelligence Agency, McGehee brought to the public his highly critical views, based on his experience. He has discussed and illustrated how the CIA's covert actions and interventionist policies can produce unfavorable outcomes. A 1981 allegation by McGehee about CIA involvement in the Indonesian killings of 1965–1966 was censored by the CIA, prompting the American Civil Liberties Union to sue on his behalf. The CIA prevailed.
1981		Viktor Suvorov	GRU	Former Soviet military intelligence officer, who after he defects to the West in 1978, exposed in his books various secrets related to the Soviet military and foreign intelligence. The first book of his memoirs was published in 1981.
1984		Clive Ponting	United Kingdom Ministry of Defence	Senior civil servant in the UK Ministry of Defence who leaked classified documents to Labour Member of Parliament Tam Dalyell confirming that the General Belgrano was sunk by British forces during the Falklands War while outside the total exclusion zone, contradicting statements by the Thatcher Government.
1984		John Michael Gravitt	General Electric	Became the first individual in 40 years to file a qui tam lawsuit under the False Claims Act after the statute had been weakened in 1943. Gravitt, a machinist foreman, sued GE for defrauding the United States Department of Defense when GE began falsely billing for work on the B1 Lancer bomber. Gravitt was laid off following his complaints to supervisors about the discrepancies. The case of Gravitt v. General Electric and Gravitt's deposition to Congress led to federal legislation bolstering the False Claims Act in 1986. The amended Act made it easier for whistleblowers to collect damages. Gravitt's suit proceeded under the 1986 amendments and GE settled the case for a then-record $3.5 million.
1984		Duncan Edmonds	Canadian Government	Canadian civil servant who reported to his chief, the top Canadian civil servant, that Minister of Defence Robert Coates had visited a West German strip club while on an official mission, with NATO documents in his possession, creating a security risk. Coates was asked to resign from Cabinet by Prime Minister Brian Mulroney, who also fired Edmonds and made him persona non grata in government circles.
1984?		Ingvar Bratt	Bofors	Engineer who revealed himself as the anonymous source in the Bofors Scandal about illegal weapon exports. An act that led to a new Swedish law concerning company secrets which commonly is referred to as Lex Bratt.
1985		Cathy Massiter	MI5	Former MI5 officer who accused the British security service of having over-zealously interpreted which groups qualified as subversive, thus justifying surveillance against them. Massiter revealed that MI5 had spied on trade unions, civil liberty organizations, and the Campaign for Nuclear Disarmament.
1985		Ronald J. Goldstein	EBASCO Constructors Inc.	Nuclear power whistleblower Goldstein was a supervisor employed by EBASCO, which was a major contractor for the construction of Houston Lighting and Power Company's South Texas Project (a complex of two nuclear power plants). In the summer of 1985, Goldstein identified safety problems with SAFETEAM, an internal compliance program established by EBASCO and Houston Lighting, including noncompliance with safety procedures, the failure to issue safety compliance reports, and quality control violations affecting the safety of the plant. SAFETEAM was promoted as an independent haven for employees to voice their safety concerns. The two companies did not inform their employees that they did not believe complaints reported to SAFETEAM had any legal protection. After he filed his report to SAFETEAM, Goldstein was fired. Subsequently, Goldstein filed suit under federal nuclear whistleblower statutes. The U.S. Department of Labor ruled that his submissions to SAFETEAM were protected and his dismissal was invalid, a finding upheld by Labor Secretary Lynn Martin. The ruling was appealed and overturned by the Fifth Circuit Court of Appeals, which ruled that private programs offered no protection to whistleblowers. After Goldstein lost his case, Congress amended the federal nuclear whistleblower law to provide protection reports made to internal systems and prevent retaliation against whistleblowers.
1986		Roger Wensil	B.F. Shaw Co.	Roger D. Wensil was America's first nationally recognized whistleblower at a nuclear weapons facility. In 1985, Wensil was wrongfully dismissed by the DuPont BF Shaw Company after exposing the illegal sale and use of drugs taking place at the Savannah River Nuclear Weapons Facility, which provided weapons-grade plutonium for the U.S. government. Wensil was reinstated by the Department of Energy in 1987, but he again faced workplace retaliation and forced out of his job shortly after. Wensil's case led to the passing of the nuclear weapon whistleblowers protection in 1992.
1986		Mordechai Vanunu	Israeli nuclear weapons program	Revealed Israel's clandestine nuclear program to the British press. He spent seventeen and a half years in prison as a result, the first eleven of these in solitary confinement. After his release, sanctions were placed on him: among others, he was not allowed to leave Israel or speak to foreigners. The sanctions have been renewed every twelve months. At present, he is appealing a further six-month prison sentence imposed by an Israeli court for having spoken to foreigners and foreign press.
1987		Joy Adams	B.F. Shaw Co.	Joy P. Adams was terminated in retaliation after testifying in support of Roger Wensil, a whistleblower who disclosed safety violations at the federal Savannah River nuclear weapons facility in South Carolina.
1987		Howard Samuel Nunn	Duke Power Company	Howard Samuel Nunn blew the whistle on the Duke Power Company and won his case in 1987. Nunn alleged that he was fired from Duke Power Company's Catawba Nuclear Power Station for raising concerns about safety and quality control, according to the court decision.
1987		Douglas Plumley	Federal Prisoner	Doug Plumley was a federal prisoner at the maximum-security prison in Lompoc, California in 1987. Plumley lost his job with the federal prison training program after writing a letter of complaint about the use of allegedly hazardous chemicals at Lompoc. He then filed another complaint concerning his dismissal to the Department of Labor. Plumley's case led to a ruling by an administrative law judge that prison inmates can be considered "federal employees," thus protected against employer retribution under the whistleblower protection law.
1988		Joseph Macktal	Halliburton	Macktal was an electrician for Halliburton Brown and Root (HB&R) who witnessed hazardous conditions during the construction of the Comanche Peak nuclear power plant. After he reported the safety issues to HB&R, the company's lawyers coerced him into signing a non-disclosure agreement that prohibited him from going to the Nuclear Regulatory Commission with his concerns. Macktal willfully violated his non-disclosure agreement, sparking a seven-year legal battle that resulted in the Department of Labor ultimately voiding his entire settlement agreement and allowing him to pursue his whistleblower case. Macktal's case set a legal precedent for whistleblowers who reported safety violations within the nuclear industry by disallowing non-disclosure agreements.
1988		Peter Wright	MI5	Former science officer of MI5 who claimed in his book, Spycatcher, that the UK Security Service plotted to remove Prime Minister Harold Wilson from office and the Director General of MI5 was a Soviet spy. After its publication in Australia, which the Thatcher government tried to block, the government attempted to ban the book in Britain under the Official Secrets Act. Through litigation, it succeeded in imposing a gag order on English newspapers to prevent them from publishing Wright's allegations. The gag orders were upheld by the Law Lords. Eventually, in 1988, the book was cleared for legitimate sale when the Law Lords acknowledged that overseas publication meant it contained no secrets. However, Wright was barred from receiving royalties from the sale of the book in the United Kingdom. In November 1991, the European Court of Human Rights ruled that the British government had breached the European Convention of Human Rights in gagging its newspapers. The British Government's legal cost were estimated at £250,000 in 1987.
1988		Harry Templeton	The Mirror Group	Harry Templeton worked as a printer on newspapers owned by Robert Maxwell's Mirror Group. In 1985, Templeton was appointed as a trustee of the Mirror Group Pension Scheme but was fired in 1988 after challenging Maxwell's misuse of pension funds. Only after Maxwell's death a couple of years later was it revealed that Maxwell had stolen £400m of staff pension money.
1988		Roland Gibeault	Genisco Technology	Gibeault filed a qui tam lawsuit against defense subcontractor Genisco Technology Corp. after working undercover for 18 months with the FBI and DCIS to uncover the company's fraudulent test methods that were used to pass key components for the High-speed Anti-Radiation Missile (HARM) missile. The FBI and DCIS case resulted in a plea-bargained $725,000 fine and three Genisco executives sent to federal prison. Gibeault, who was fired from Genisco following revelation of whistleblowing, received $131,250 of the fine. In 1989, Gibeault and fellow employee Inge Maudal also filed qui tam actions against Genisco's parent company, Texas Instruments.
1988		Michael Haddle	Healthmaster, Inc.	Worked for Healthmaster, Inc. and blew the whistle on whistleblower retaliation when he was fired from his job because he was involved and testified in a Medicare fraud case against Healthmaster. He filed a complaint in 1998 and the Eleventh Circuit court ruled that he had not been retaliated against, but the Court of Appeals reversed that finding, also in 1998. The U.S. Department of Justice submitted an amicus brief in support of Haddle before the decision was reversed.
1989		Douglas D. Keeth	United Technologies Corporation	Filed a qui tam lawsuit against United Technologies Corp. (UTX) where he held the title of vice president of finance. Mr. Keeth and others had investigated billing practices at UTX's Sikorsky Aircraft division, uncovering inflated progress billings going back at least as far as 1982. UTX offered Mr. Keeth a $1 million severance payment if he would keep quiet, but Keeth rejected the offer. In 1994, UTX paid $150 million to the government, and Keeth was awarded a bounty of $22.5 million.
1989		William Schumer	Hughes Aircraft	Filed a lawsuit in January 1989 alleging fraud by Hughes Aircraft concerning the B-2 bomber. In 1997 the Supreme Court held that the claim should have been dismissed as based on invalid retroactive legislation because the alleged fraud occurred in 1982–1984, before the 1986 amendments to the Fraudulent Claims Act which might have permitted it. The government did not support Schumer in his lawsuit as it had determined the alleged fraud had benefited the government by shifting costs from the cost-plus B-2 contract to the fixed-price F-15 contract.
1989/ 1991		Myron Mehlman	Mobil	A toxicologist, he warned managers at Mobil that the company's gasoline that was being sold in Japan contained benzene over 5 percent, and that levels needed to be reduced. Upon his return to the United States, he was fired. He later successfully sued the company.

== 1990s ==
Year	Image	Name	Organization	Action
1990		Vera English	General Electric Company	Vera English was employed as a lab technician at a nuclear facility operated by General Electric Company (GE). English was terminated after exposing widespread radioactive contamination in the facility. Her Supreme Court case, English v. General Electric Company, set a precedent that allowed whistleblowers to pursue cases under state law. Her victory also demonstrated the application of whistleblower protection legislation in cases of whistleblowing in nuclear energy cases.
1990		Arnold Gundersen	Nuclear Energy Services	Nuclear power whistleblower Arnold Gundersen discovered radioactive material in an accounting safe at Nuclear Energy Services (NES) in Danbury, Connecticut, the consulting firm where he held a $120,000-a-year job as senior vice president. Three weeks after he notified the company president of what he believed to be radiation safety violations, Gundersen was fired. According to The New York Times, for three years, Gundersen "was awakened by harassing phone calls in the middle of the night" and he "became concerned about his family's safety". Gundersen believes he was blacklisted, harassed and fired for doing what he thought was right. NES filed a $1.5 million defamation lawsuit against him that was settled out-of-court. A U.S. Nuclear Regulatory Commission report concluded that there had been irregularities at NES, and the Office of the Inspector General reported that the NRC had violated its regulations by sending business to NES.
1992		Mark Whitacre	Archer Daniels Midland	PhD scientist and former Divisional President with Archer Daniels Midland, who worked with the FBI as a secret informant, to blow the whistle on a price-fixing cartel in his company. This story is featured in the film The Informant! where Whitacre is portrayed by Matt Damon.
1992	Keith A. Schooley	Keith A. Schooley		Keith A. Schooley (born 1952) is an American author and former stockbroker at Merrill Lynch, who brought attention to fraud and corruption within the firm at the Oklahoma and Texas offices in 1992 as a whistleblower. As a result, he was terminated from the firm, and sued the corporation in a case that went to the Oklahoma Supreme Court, and Tenth Circuit Court of Appeals.
1992		Linda Mitchell	Arizona Public Service Company	While working at the Palo Verde Nuclear Generating Station, Mitchell blew the whistle on the Arizona Public Service Company, which owned the generating station. In 1985, Mitchel reported various safety concerns she had at Palo Verde to the Nuclear Regulatory Commission (NRC) and continued to bring up concerns to management about concerns regarding computer programs the facility used and the layout of the plant. Mitchell filed a complaint in 1989 to the NRC, alleging that the Arizona Public Service Co. tried to suppress an NRC investigator's findings of safety issues at Palo Verde. She was subjected to severe harassment in the workplace and in her personal life and won a Department of Labor discrimination lawsuit in 1992. In 1994, Mitchell was granted permission to have an administrative public hearing before the NRC's Atomic Safety and Licensing Board; she also asked for the three units at Palo Verde to be halted to 0% power until a review of the work environment could be conducted.
1993		Sarah Thomas	Arizona Public Service	Arizona Public Service (APS) employee Sarah Thomas was harassed and retaliated against by her supervisor after she raised concerns regarding safety and regulatory violation that occurred in her workplace. She filed a complaint with the Department of Labor concerning the safety violations, failure to promote, and harassment on the job. APS was ordered to promote Thomas to Senior Test Technician and provide compensation for damages she suffered as the result of discriminatory treatment.
1993	Erin Brockovich in 2007	Erin Brockovich	PG&E	Discovered widespread unexplained illness in Hinkley, California and helped the town sue the utility company PG&E for polluting the town's water with chromium 6. The damages ordered by the court were the largest recovered in a direct-action lawsuit at the time at $333 million.
1994		William Marcus	Environmental Protection Agency (EPA)	As a Senior Science Advisor for the Environmental Protection Agency (EPA), Marcus witnessed the Office of Drinking Water approve a policy that added fluoride to the nation's drinking water. Marcus was fired after he reported the fluoride could increase cancer rates in the affected population. His testimony led to the discovery of numerous frauds committed by major chemical companies who tried to silence his concerns. Marcus prevailed in front of an Administrative Law Judge and was reinstated with full back pay, as well as a large compensatory damage reward.
1994		André Cicolella	French Institute for Research and Security	André Cicolella showed that fetal malformations are associated with being exposed in utero to glycol ethers. The French Institute for Research and Security decided not to allow him to participate in a symposium that he was organizing on health risks linked with ether glycols, and fired him. In 1998 it was confirmed that he was right.
1995		William Sanjour	United States Environmental Protection Agency	William Sanjour worked for the Environmental Protection Agency (EPA) for over 25 years, where he constantly challenged the safety practices of the agency and ensured the EPA properly dealt with hazardous waste. In 1995, Sanjour won a landmark lawsuit that set a nationwide precedent and First Amendment right permitting federal employees to blow the whistle on their employers. In Sanjour v. EPA, he challenged agency rules restricting EPA employees from talking to environmental groups, a decision that has not been overruled to this day. Sanjour was the recipient of the 2007 Association of Certified Fraud Examiners (ACFE) Sentinel Award, which recognizes those who "choose truth over self."
1995		Allen Mosbaugh	Georgia Power Company	Reported safety concerns at Georgia Power Company in 1990 when he worked at the Vogtle Electric Generating Plant as a superintendent of engineering liaison. In 1989, he sent the Nuclear Regulatory Commission a memo about a "violation of technical specifications" in regards to specific valves at the plant. In September 1990, Mosbaugh joined Marvin Hobby in petitioning the Nuclear Regulatory Commission to conduct a review of the Georgia Power Company and impose civil penalties for improper operation at the facility and illegally transferring control to the Southern Nuclear Operating Company. Mosbaugh also recorded his coworkers and superiors who documented safety violations. He was discharged from his job in October 1990 and filed a complaint alleging that his firing was an act of whistleblower retaliation under the Energy Reorganization Act of 1974, but the administrative law judge ruled in 1992 that Georgia Power Company had not acted in retaliation. In 1993, the Nuclear Regulatory Commission issued a report that supported Mosbaugh's whistleblower retaliation claim. In 1995, the Secretary of Labor concluded that Mosbaugh had been retaliated against after he engaged in "protected activity," which reversed the 1992 ruling.
1996		Shannon Doyle	Alabama Power	Reported safety violations at the J.M Farley Nuclear Plant, run by Alabama Power, to the Nuclear Regulatory Commission. In 1989, Doyle filed a complaint against Hydro Nuclear Services under the Energy Reorganization Act of 1974 when the company did not hire him as a "casual employee" because he did not sign a release that allowed the company to perform a background check.
1996		George Galatis	Nuclear power industry	Nuclear power whistleblower George Galatis was a senior nuclear engineer who reported safety problems at the Millstone 1 Nuclear Power Plant, relating to reactor refueling procedures, in 1996. The unsafe procedures meant that spent fuel rod pools at Unit 1 had the potential to boil, possibly releasing radioactive steam. Galatis eventually took his concerns to the Nuclear Regulatory Commission, to find that they had "known about the unsafe procedures for years". As a result of going to the NRC, Galatis experienced "subtle forms of harassment, retaliation, and intimidation". The NRC Office of Inspector General investigated this episode and essentially agreed with Galatis in Case Number 95-771, the report of which tells the whole story. George Galatis was the subject of a Time magazine cover story on March 4, 1996. Millstone 1 was permanently closed in July 1998.
1996		Jeffrey Wigand	Brown & Williamson	Jeffrey Wigand had been recently fired from his position as vice president of research and development at tobacco company Brown & Williamson when, on February 4, 1996, he stated on the CBS news program 60 Minutes that the company intentionally manipulated the level of nicotine in cigarette smoke to addict smokers. Wigand claims that he was subsequently harassed and received anonymous death threats. He was portrayed by Russell Crowe in the 1999 film The Insider.
1996		Allan Cutler	Canadian government	The first whistleblower on the Canadian "AdScam" or sponsorship scandal. Without legal protection, he was fired by the Canadian government. As the case developed, federal legislation was passed to protect future whistleblowers in the Canadian civil service. Several convictions have been recorded to date with the case, with proceedings still in progress.
1996		David Franklin	Parke-Davis	Exposed illegal promotion of the epilepsy drug Neurontin for unapproved uses while withholding evidence that the drug was not effective for these conditions. Parke-Davis's new owners Pfizer eventually pleaded guilty and paid criminal and civil fines of $430 million. The case had widespread effects including establishing a new standard for pharmaceutical marketing practices; broadening the use of the False Claims Act to make fraudulent marketing claims criminal violations; exposing complicity and active participation in fraud by renowned physicians; and demonstrating how medical literature had been systematically adulterated by the pharmaceutical industry and its paid clinical consultants. Under the False Claims Act, Dr Franklin receives $24.6m as part of the settlement agreement.
1996		Timothy Kerr and George D. Wynalda Jr.	Boeing	In 1996, Timothy Kerr, a US military veteran who was employed as a rigger responsible for the installation of cables to operate equipment such as rudders, flaps, and throttles on Boeing 767 aircraft from 1986 to 1993, initiated a whistleblower lawsuit against Boeing. Kerr alleged that Boeing had ignored safety measures by delivering both civilian and military aircraft (including 767s, alongside 747s, 757s, AWACS, and even Air Force One) containing flaws such as "is installed cables, badly drilled holes, and overtightened bolts" to maintain production schedules. Kerr also noted that some of these flaws were the product of intentional sabotage by Boeing employees due to labor disputes and anti-Asian sentiment, such as the deliberate damage of components on planes destined for China Airlines and various Japan-based civil and military air carriers. He was joined by George D. Wynalda Jr., another US military veteran acting as a production line inspector at Boeing's plant in Auburn, Washington, who stated that he observed the same problems persisting up to at least 1996. Reportage by Ed Vulliamy from The Observer attributed the crashes of Lauda Air Flight 004 in 1991 and EgyptAir Flight 990 in 1999 to the same production line failures identified by Kerr and Wynalda Jr.
1996		Michael Ruppert	Los Angeles Police Department	Former LAPD narcotics officer who contested the CIA director John Deutch's assertions that the CIA was not complicit in drug trafficking during a town hall meeting at Los Angeles' Locke High School on November 5, 1995. At the meeting, Ruppert publicly alleged the existence of classified CIA programs named "Amadeus", "Pegasus", and "Watchtower", claiming to possess evidence for the programs including redacted documents from "Watchtower", and stated that CIA officers had attempted to involve him in protecting these CIA operations during the late 1970s. His account corresponds to similar allegations regarding Operation Watchtower.
1997		Juan Walterspiel	Pfizer	Was terminated by Pfizer after exposing a Nigerian study of Trovan was "in violation of ethical rules for the conduct of medical experiments in humans." His unlawful termination case was confidentially settled.
1996/ 1998		Nancy Olivieri	Apotex	Starting in 1996, Olivieri was part of a group conducting a clinical trial to evaluate the use of a drug of Apotex, deferiprone, in treating persons with a blood disorder, thalassaemia. During the trial, Olivieri became concerned about evidence that pointed to the toxicity of the study drug and to the drug being inefficacious. Olivieri informed both the research ethics board that was monitoring the study and Apotex, the drug maker. The research ethics board instructed Olivieri to inform participants about her concerns. Apotex responded by noting that Olivieri had signed a confidentiality agreement as part of the drug trial and that informing participants about her concerns, the validity of which Apotex disputed, would violate that confidentiality agreement. Apotex threatened to vigorously pursue all legal remedies against her if she disclosed her conclusions to patients. Olivieri disclosed her concerns to her patients and Apotex ended the portion of the study in which she was participating. In 1998, the New England Journal of Medicine published her paper suggesting that deferiprone led to progressive hepatic fibrosis.
1997		Frederic Whitehurst	Federal Bureau of Investigation	A chemist at the U.S. Federal Bureau of Investigation who was the FBI Laboratory's foremost expert on explosives residue in the 1990s, Whitehurst became the first modern-day FBI whistleblower. He reported a lack of scientific standards and serious flaws in the FBI Lab, including in the first World Trade Center bombing cases, and the Oklahoma City bombing case. Whitehurst's whistleblower disclosures triggered an overhaul of the FBI's crime lab following a report by the U.S. Department of Justice Inspector General in 1997. In 1997, Whitehurst testified at the House Judiciary Subcommittee's hearings on the FBI crime lab. Dr. Whitehurst filed a federal lawsuit claiming whistleblower retaliation, and he reached a settlement with the FBI worth more than $1.16 million. Whitehurst now directs the FBI Oversight Project of the National Whistleblower Center.
1997		David Shayler	MI5	Along with girlfriend Annie Machon, resigned from MI5 to expose alleged criminal acts by the UK Secret Services, including a failed assassination attempt on Muammar Gaddafi. Shayler also accused the Security Services of planting false stories in the press, substantiated in one example by a court.
1997		Christoph Meili	UBS	A night guard at a Swiss bank, he discovered that his employer was destroying records of savings by Holocaust victims, which the bank was required to return to heirs of the victims. After the Swiss authorities sought to arrest Meili, he was given political asylum in the United States.
1997		Alan Parkinson	Australian Government	Alan Parkinson is a mechanical and nuclear engineer who has written the 2007 book, Maralinga: Australia's Nuclear Waste Cover-up, about the clean-up of the British atomic bomb test site at Maralinga in South Australia. In 1993, Parkinson became the key person on the Maralinga clean-up project, representing the then federal Labor government. By 1997, however, there was much cost-cutting involved which compromised the project, and personal differences about how the project should proceed, which led to the sacking of Parkinson by the new Howard government. The clean-up was unsatisfactory according to Parkinson and he exposed the situation through the Australian Broadcasting Corporation, provoking a strong rebuttal and personal abuse from the government.
1998		Shiv Chopra	Canadian government	A microbiologist and activist who was involved in one of the first major whistleblowing incidents in the Canadian public service.
1998		Paul van Buitenen	European Commission	Accused European Commission members of corruption. (See Resignation of the Santer Commission).
1998		Marc Hodler	International Olympic Committee	IOC member who blew the whistle on the Winter Olympic bid scandal for the 2002 Salt Lake City games.
1998		Linda Tripp	Clinton Administration	Tripp was a White House staff member who disclosed to the Office of Independent Counsel that Monica Lewinsky committed perjury and attempted to suborn perjury, and President Bill Clinton committed misconduct, by denying the Clinton-Lewinsky scandal in the Paula Jones federal civil rights suit. A victim of retaliation by the Clinton Administration, Tripp successfully sued the Department of Defense and the Justice Department for releasing information from her security file and employment file to the news media in violation of the Privacy Act of 1974. In 2003, Tripp settled with the federal government for over $595,000. In addition, she received a retroactive promotion and retroactive pay for the years 1998, 1999, and 2000, a pension, and was cleared to work for the federal government again.
1999		Harry Markopolos		Early whistleblower of suspected securities fraud by Bernard Madoff, tipping off the United States Securities and Exchange Commission (SEC) repeatedly.
1999		Yury Bandazhevsky		In 1999, he released the results that he accumulated about the health problems of children in the contaminated area of Chernobyl. He was arrested in July 1999 and sentenced to 8 years imprisonment in 2001 before being released in 2005
1990s/ 2000s		Marlene Garcia-Esperat	Philippines Department of Agriculture	Former analytical chemist for the Philippines Department of Agriculture who became a journalist to expose departmental corruption, and was murdered in 2005. Her assailants later surrendered to police, and have testified that they were hired by officials in the Department of Agriculture.
1990s/ 2000s		Janet Howard, Tanya Ward Jordan and Joyce E. Megginson	United States Department of Commerce	Exposed widespread systemic racism and retaliation within the Department of Commerce against African-American employees.

== 2000s ==
Year	Image	Name	Organization	Action
2000s		Karen Kwiatkowski	United States Air Force	Retired lieutenant colonel in the U.S. Air Force who worked as a desk officer in The Pentagon and in several roles in the National Security Agency. She has written several essays on corrupting political influences of military intelligence leading up to the invasion of Iraq in 2003, and has said that she was the anonymous source for Seymour Hersh and Warren Strobel on their exposés of pre-war intelligence.
2000		Marsha Coleman-Adebayo	United States Environmental Protection Agency	Marsha Coleman-Adebayo was a Senior Policy Analyst in the Office of the Administrator at the U.S. Environmental Protection Agency (EPA). She blew the whistle on the EPA for racial and gender discrimination in violation of Civil Rights Act of 1964 which began after she was removed from her position in South Africa where her "job was to essentially help the South African government to work on issues that impact public health". In South Africa, she brought to the attention of the EPA the dangerous conditions that an American company was making African miners work under, which were causing them to be exposed to vanadium, a dangerous substance. Her case eventually led to the passing of the No-FEAR Act in 2002 which makes federal agencies more accountable for employee complaints.
2002		Cynthia Cooper	Worldcom	Exposed corporate financial scandal. Jointly named Time's People of the Year in 2002.
2002		Sherron Watkins	Enron	Exposed corporate financial scandal as Enron vice president in 2001. Watkins was named Time's People of the Year in 2002.
2002		Coleen Rowley	Federal Bureau of Investigation	Outlined the FBI's slow action before the September 11, 2001 attacks. Jointly named Time's People of the Year in 2002.
2002		William Binney; J. Kirke Wiebe; Edward Loomis	National Security Agency	NSA officials initially joined House Permanent Select Committee on Intelligence staffer Diane Roark in asking the U.S. Department of Defense inspector general to investigate wasteful spending on the Trailblazer Project and the NSA officials eventually went public when they were ignored and retaliated upon. They claim that Thinthread was more focused and thus more effective and lower cost than Trailblazer and subsequent programs, which automatically collected trillions of domestic communications of Americans in deliberate violation of the U.S. Constitution.
2002		Sibel Edmonds	Federal Bureau of Investigation	Former FBI translator naturalized American citizen of Turkish descent who was fired in 2002 by the FBI for attempting to report cover-ups of security issues, potential espionage, and incompetence. She has been gagged by the State Secrets Privilege in her efforts to go to court on these issues, including a rejection in 2005 by the Supreme Court of the United States to hear her case without comment. She is the founder of the National Security Whistleblowers Coalition (NSWBC) that is looking to lobby congress and help other whistleblowers with legal and other forms of assistance.
2002 & 2004		Jeffrey Alexander Sterling	Central Intelligence Agency	Sentenced to 3.5 years in prison for revealing details about Operation Merlin (covert operation to supply Iran with flawed nuclear warhead blueprints) to journalist James Risen.
2003		Katharine Gun	United Kingdom GCHQ	Leaked top-secret information to the press concerning alleged illegal activities by the United States and the United Kingdom in their push for the 2003 invasion of Iraq.
2003		Joseph Wilson	United States Government	Former U.S. ambassador, whose editorial in The New York Times, "What I Didn't Find in Africa", showed reasons for the 2003 invasion of Iraq.
2004		Neil Patrick Carrick	Greater Grace World Outreach	A former member and staff member of Greater Grace World Outreach in Baltimore, Maryland U.S.A. who uncovered financial and sexual abuse by church leaders. Eventually, The Baltimore Sun would publish a front-page story uncovering a $500,000 payoff regarding a cover-up of an affair of a staff Pastor. Multiple articles across the United States and Internationally would follow. Following the split of the international organization hundreds of congregations, and schools would change their affiliation with the organization. In the following years, several individuals would be convicted of sexual abuse-related crimes including staff members from the Baltimore Church.
2004		Mukesh Kapila	Darfur genocide	In 2003–2004 Kapila was the United Nations Resident and Humanitarian Coordinator, and the UN Development Program Resident Representative for the Sudan. His reports about the Darfur conflict were at the time dismissed by the Government of Sudan as "a heap of lies", though they succeeded in bringing Darfur to the attention of the world's media for the first time. Kapila lost his job after becoming a whistleblower regarding UN inaction in Darfur and had to leave Sudan. He also received many death threats which continued for many years.
2004		Samuel Provance Joe Darby	United States Army	Publicly revealed the role of interrogators in the abuses, as well the general effort to cover up the Abu Ghraib prisoner abuse itself. Darby received a John F. Kennedy Profile in Courage Award.
2005		Renee Dufault	Food and Drug Administration	Dufault presented research finding to the United States Food and Drug Administration (FDA) in 2005 that showed caustic soda (lye) used in the production and manufacturing of High Fructose Corn Syrup, left trace amounts of mercury in foods containing High Fructose Corn Syrup. After independent testing verified her finding, she attempted to publish her research and was denied usage of Federal extramural data. She left the FDA in 2008 to make her research public.
2005		Russ Tice	United States Government	Former intelligence analyst for the National Security Agency (NSA), the U.S. Air Force, the Office of Naval Intelligence, and the Defense Intelligence Agency. Tice first approached Congress and eventually the media about the warrantless surveillance of the U.S. population by the NSA. Tice was a major source for the 2005 New York Times exposé and spoke out widely following subsequent disclosures by other NSA whistleblowers. He was the first to speak publicly and openly about allegations during the era beginning with the George W. Bush administration (which continues into the Obama administration). He had earlier been known for reporting suspicions that a DIA colleague of his might be a Chinese spy.
2005/ 2011		Thomas Andrews Drake	National Security Agency	Thomas Drake worked at the NSA in various analyst and management positions. He blew the whistle on the NSA's Trailblazer Project that he felt was a violation of the Fourth Amendment and other laws and regulations. He contacted The Baltimore Sun which published articles about waste, fraud, and abuse at the NSA, including stories about Trailblazer. In April 2010, Drake was indicted by a grand jury on various charges, including obstructing justice and making false statements. After the May 22, 2011 broadcast of a 60 Minutes episode on the Drake case, the government dropped all of the charges against Drake and agreed not to seek any jail time in return for Drake's agreement to plead guilty to a misdemeanor of misusing the agency's computer system. Drake was sentenced to one year of probation and community service.
2005		Thomas Tamm	United States Department of Justice	Attorney for the DOJ's Office of Intelligence Policy and Review who initially informed The New York Times for the story that became a 2005 exposé on mass warrantless surveillance. His home was raided in 2007 during an FBI investigation of the leaks and he began to openly speak out publicly in 2008.
2006		Michael DeKort Anthony D'Armiento	United States Department of Homeland Security – United States Coast Guard	Michael DeKort was an American systems engineer and project manager at Lockheed Martin who posted a whistleblowing video on YouTube about the Lockheed Integrated Deepwater System Program. In 2008, DeKort was awarded the Society on Social Implications of Technology's public service award. As well as the Barus Ethics Award from the IEEE for his efforts to ensure accountability and whistleblowing video. D'Armiento claimed retaliation for reporting the issues.
2006		Mark Klein	AT&T, National Security Agency	Retired communications technician for AT&T who revealed the details of the secret 2003 construction of a monitoring facility in Room 641A of 611 Folsom Street in San Francisco, the site of a large SBC phone building, three floors of which are occupied by AT&T. The facility is alleged to be one of several operated by the National Security Agency as part of the warrantless surveillance undertaken by the Bush administration in the wake of the September 11, 2001 terrorist attacks.
2006		Cate Jenkins	United States Environmental Protection Agency	Wrote memos to the EPA Inspector General, U.S. Congress, and FBI detailing the chemical composition of dust from the September 11 attacks and its hazards to responders. She alerted The New York Times in 2006 and said in a 2009 CBS interview that the EPA explicitly lied about the danger of the dust which caused chemical burns in the lungs of responders, debilitating illnesses in many that included fatalities, and that it could have been prevented with proper safety equipment. Jenkins claims that the EPA has been misleading about evidence of debris inhalation hazards since the 1980s. She was fired and in 2012 successfully sued to be reinstated.
2007		John Kiriakou	Central Intelligence Agency	In an interview with ABC News on December 10, CIA officer Kiriakou disclosed that the agency waterboarded detainees and that this constituted torture. In the months following, Kiriakou passed the identity of a covert CIA operative to a reporter. He was convicted of violating the Intelligence Identities Protection Act and sentenced, on January 25, 2013, to 30 months imprisonment. Having served the first months of his service he wrote an open letter describing the inhuman circumstances at the correction facility.
2008		Anat Kamm	Israeli Defense Force	Leaked documents to the media that revealed the IDF had been engaging in extrajudicial killings. While serving as an assistant in the Central Command bureau, Kamm secretly copied classified documents that she leaked to the Israeli Haaretz journalist Uri Blau after her military service was over. The leak suggested that the IDF had defied a court ruling against assassinating wanted militants in the West Bank who could potentially be arrested safely. Kamm was convicted of espionage and providing confidential information without authorization.
2008		Rudolf Elmer	Julius Bär	A long-term employee of the Swiss bank whose final position entailed overseeing its Caribbean operations until he was terminated in 2002, Elmer blew the whistle on Julius Bär in 2008 when he gave secret documents to WikiLeaks. The documents detailed Julius Bär's activities in the Cayman Islands and alleged tax evasion. Convicted in Switzerland in January 2011, he was rearrested immediately for having distributed illegally obtained data to WikiLeaks. Julius Bär alleges that Elmer has doctored evidence to suggest the tax evasion.

== 2010s ==
Year	Image	Name	Organization	Action
2010		Chelsea Manning	United States Army	U.S. Army intelligence analyst who released the largest set of classified documents ever, mostly published by WikiLeaks and their media partners. The material included videos of the July 12, 2007, Baghdad airstrike and the 2009 Granai airstrike in Afghanistan; 250,000 United States diplomatic cables; and 500,000 army reports that came to be known as the Iraq War logs and Afghan War logs. Manning was convicted of violating the Espionage Act and other offenses and sentenced to 35 years in prison.
2011		Michael Woodford	Olympus Corporation	Corporate president, revealed the Olympus scandal in which past losses were concealed and written off via excessive fee payments
2012		Antoine Deltour	PricewaterhouseCoopers	In 2012 Deltour's leaking of 28,000 pages of confidential documents revealing how multinational companies routed funds to lower corporate tax bills, gave rise to the Luxembourg Leaks journalistic investigation and attracted international attention to tax avoidance schemes in Luxembourg and elsewhere. There was no suggestion that the arrangements were illegal under Luxembourg law, but the disclosures prompted wider public debate on corporate tax avoidance schemes and criminal charges against Deltour.
2013		Edward Snowden	National Security Agency	Booz Allen Hamilton contractor Edward Snowden released classified material on top-secret NSA programs including the PRISM surveillance program to The Guardian and The Washington Post in June 2013.
2013		Witness K	Australian Secret Intelligence Service	Exposed the Australia-East Timor spying scandal, that the Australian government had bugged negotiations with East Timor to force them to sign contracts that allowed the Australian government to continue extracting from their oil and gas fields, and that the then Foreign Minister of Australia, Alexander Downer went on to score a lucrative contract with Woodside Petroleum, who held the license over the oil fields. The Australian government is attempting to try Witness K and their lawyer, Bernard Collaery in a secret court for breaching national security.
2007/ 2014		Howard Wilkinson	Danske Bank	In 2018, news of a $200 billion money laundering scheme and an anonymous internal whistleblower at Danske Bank broke. In December 2018, Wilkinson testified in front of the Danish Parliament, discussing his role as a whistleblower and addressing the EU whistleblower laws.
2015		John Doe	Mossack Fonseca	John Doe is the pseudonym used by the anonymous whistleblower in the 2015 Panama Papers leak, who disclosed 11.5 million documents detailing financial and attorney-client information from Panamanian law firm Mossack Fonseca to the Süddeutsche Zeitung.
2016		Edgar Matobato	Davao Death Squad	He appeared before the Philippine Senate on September 15, 2016 during a hearing on extra-judicial killings. At the hearing, Matobato recounted his experiences as a killer and narrated how he killed his victims. He revealed that Duterte once killed a certain Hamizola using an Uzi, emptying the gun on the victim. On October 7, 2016, Edgar Matobato was turned over by Senator Antonio Trillanes to the Philippine National Police after an arrest warrant was issued to him.
2017		Reality Winner	Pluribus International Corporation (NSA contractor)	Reality Winner was an NSA contractor for Pluribus International Corporation. She leaked an intelligence report about Russian interference in the 2016 United States elections.
2017		Natalie Edwards	Financial Crimes division (FinCEN) of the United States Treasury	Natalie Edwards, a senior official with the Financial Crimes division (FinCEN) of the United States Treasury, informed BuzzFeed News of numerous suspicious activity reports (SARs) involving Maria Butina, Rick Gates, Paul Manafort, the Russian Embassy in the United States, and a Russian firm associated with money laundering, Prevezon Alexander, LLC. The information in these SARs contained details about Russia's involvement in the 2016 United States presidential election.
2017		Susan Rigetti	Uber	In February 2017, Rigetti wrote a 3,000-word blog post on sexual harassment at Uber, including its hostile work culture for female employees and how the company's human resource department refused to punish her former manager, who had propositioned her for sex. External probes confirmed her account and led to multiple firings, including CEO Travis Kalanick.
2017		Tyler Schultz and Erika Cheung and Female	Theranos	Tyler Schultz and Erika Cheung reported fraud and the falsification of medical testing devices at America start-up Theranos, leading the arrest and imprisonment of founder Elizabeth Holmes.
2018		David Lochridge	OceanGate	Was fired by OceanGate when he refused to sign off on the Titan submersible, writing a quality-control report with 27 issues. Filed a whistleblower complaint with the Occupational Safety and Health Administration, but withdrew it after OceanGate sued him for breach of contract. The submersible imploded in 2023, killing all five passengers.
2019/ 2020		Anonymous	Central Intelligence Agency	On August 12, 2019, an unnamed CIA officer filed a whistleblower complaint with the Inspector General of the Intelligence Community under provisions of the Intelligence Community Whistleblower Protection Act. On September 18, The Washington Post broke the story, saying the complaint concerned a promise U.S. President Donald Trump made during communication with an unnamed foreign leader. On September 24, Nancy Pelosi, Speaker of the U.S. House of Representatives, announced a formal impeachment inquiry, which was widely attributed to the whistleblower's complaint. What became known as the Trump–Ukraine scandal culminated on December 18 in the impeachment of the president. On February 5, 2020, the U.S. Senate acquitted Trump of the charges brought against him by the House.
2019/ 2020		Li Wenliang	Wuhan Central Hospital	Li Wenliang (Chinese: 李文亮; pinyin: Lǐ Wénliàng; 12 October 1986 – 7 February 2020) was a Chinese ophthalmologist at Wuhan Central Hospital who warned about the COVID-19 pandemic on 30 December 2019. On 3 January 2020, Wuhan police summoned and falsely admonished him for "making false comments on the Internet." Li returned to work but later contracted the virus from an infected patient. He died from the infection on 7 February 2020.
2019		Curtis Ewbank Ed Pierson	Boeing	Leaked information regarding damaged parts and mistakes implicated in the crashes of two aircraft that killed 346 people and resulted in the Boeing 737 MAX groundings when the Maneuvering Characteristics Augmentation Systems (MCAS) were triggered.

== 2020s ==
Year	Image	Name	Organization	Action
2020		Rick Bright	United States Department of Health and Human Services (HHS)	Bright, the director of the Biomedical Advanced Research and Development Authority (BARDA), alleged that the Trump administration ignored his early warnings about the COVID-19 pandemic and illegally retaliated against him by ousting him from his role. The U.S. Office of Special Counsel determined that Bright had been illegally retaliated against.
2020-2021		Frances Haugen	Facebook	Frances Haugen, formerly a product manager in the civic integrity department at Facebook, disclosed thousands of internal documents related to user research and impact, special policy exceptions for high-profile users, and hate speech, among others, to the U.S. Securities and Exchange Commission (SEC) and the Wall Street Journal, in a leak termed the Facebook Files.
2021		Cher Scarlett	Apple	Reported Apple to the NLRB alleging suppression of worker organizing and discussions about pay. Founder and de facto face of #AppleToo. Reported Apple to the SEC for allegedly misleading the agency in a filing about using concealment clauses in exit packages to silence victims of harassment and discrimination. Violated an NDA to share the details of an agreement with the Financial Times. Her actions prompted 8 state treasurers to call on the SEC to investigate.
2021		Pav Gill	Wirecard	Famed whistleblower who blew the whistle on the world's largest fintech fraud and Germany's largest financial scandal, Wirecard. Pav Gill was the company's Head of Legal in the Asia-Pacific region and was approached by internal whistleblowers who raised concerns regarding the company's financial accounting and health. Pav conducted an investigation, which ultimately led to him being forced to leave the company following threats to his life. After leaving the company, he approached the Financial Times and Suddeutsche Zeitung, whose joint work ultimately led to the demise of the company in 2020.
2021		Syarhey Savelyeu	Federal Penitentiary Service	In October 2021, after eight years of collecting evidence, Gulagu.net published over a thousand videos of beatings and torture in prisons throughout Russia. A large amount of the videos were leaked by prison inmate IT specialist Syarhey Savelyeu who helped operate computers in the prison. Following the leak Savelyeu fled Russia to seek asylum in France. A warrant was issued for his arrest.
2023		Jesse Yang	Nova Scotia Health Authority	Reported NSHA to Nova Scotia Ombudsman alleging unethical data manipulation and fraudulent prediction model of emergency room waiting time. Filed complaint to Nova Scotia Labor Board for alleged retaliation. His actions prompted an internal investigation, the first hearing in Canada on Public Interest Disclosure Act, and the opponent party to call on the Auditor General to review the untendered health app in which the model was embedded. and questioned the reliability of the emergency department wait times feature in the app.
2024		John Barnett Joshua Dean Martin Bickeboeller Santiago Paredes	Spirit AeroSystems Boeing	Filed complaints regarding hundreds of defective parts manufactured for the Boeing 737 MAX that later resulted in a door blowing off a plane while in flight.
2024		Suchir Balaji	OpenAI	Published an essay accusing OpenAI, his former employer, of improper use of copyrighted data in the training of AI tools such as ChatGPT. In October of 2024, Balaji was interviewed by the New York Times regarding OpenAI and its use of copyrighted data. Balaji mysteriously died, the investigation has listed self-inflicted gunshot wound as the cause of death. His body was found in his San Francisco apartment on November 26th, 2024. Fortune magazine refuted his purported whistleblower status stating that "Balaji wasn’t divulging any previously unknown inside information about the company".
2025		Jason Sattizahn	Meta	A former Trust & Safety researcher at Facebook/Meta, disclosed systematic manipulation, suppression and erasure of internal research on harms to Meta’s users and children. His actions included disclosures to the FTC, SEC and U.S. Judiciary, as well as testimony as a witness in multiple trials against Meta.
2025		Sarah Wynn-Williams	Meta	Published the book Careless People and lodged 78‑page complaint with the US Securities and Exchange Commission (SEC) detailing complicit behavior by Meta, including efforts to surrender user privacy and free speech protections in order to enter the Chinese market.
2026		Ryan Schwank	United States Immigration and Customs Enforcement	Was previously a lawyer for I.C.E. and is now accusing them in court as of early 2026 for lack of training in new agents.

== See also ==
- List of FBI whistleblowers
