= Jason Sattizahn =

American integrative neuroscientist, UX researcher and whistleblower

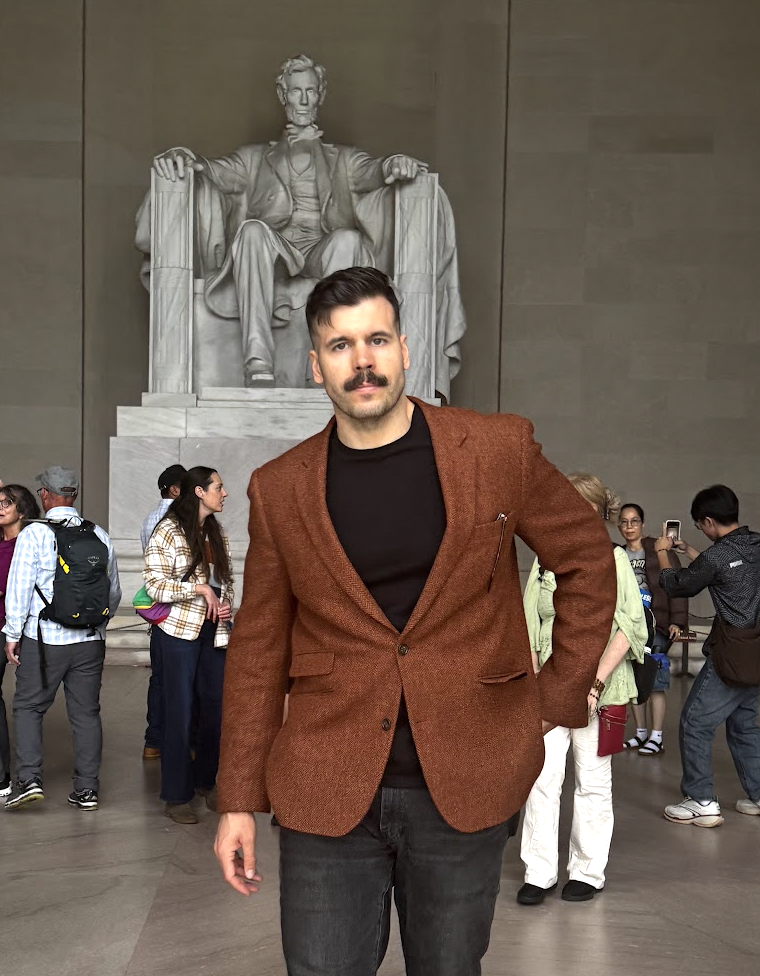
- Born: Missouri, U.S.
- Education: University of Chicago; University of Missouri; Rock Bridge High School
- Known for: 2025 Meta Platforms whistleblowing disclosures
- Scientific career
- Fields: Integrative neuroscience, user experience (UX) research
- Workplaces: Sony Interactive Entertainment; Meta Platforms
- Doctoral advisor: Sian Beilock

Jason Sattizahn is an American integrative neuroscientist, user experience (UX) researcher, and whistleblower known for his professional contributions to the video game industry and for his 2025 disclosures regarding troubling safety and integrity practices at Meta Platforms.

== Education and early academic research ==
Sattizahn was born and raised in Missouri. He attended the University of Chicago, where he earned a PhD in integrative neuroscience from the Psychology department in 2017. During his academic tenure, the research he published focused on the limitations and changes of the human mind under anxiety and stress, including how perception impacts education and how hormones interact with mental processing. His most recent academic work investigated how fluctuating hormone levels and competition outcomes affected working memory and mathematical accuracy. His doctoral adviser was Sian Beilock.

== Career ==
=== Video game development ===
Sattizahn served as a UX Researcher for Sony Interactive Entertainment (SIE) in the Worldwide Studios Experience Lab. His research contributed to several major PlayStation titles, including Horizon: Zero Dawn (2017) and God of War (2018), the 2018 Game of the Year.

=== Meta ===
Between April 2018 and May 2024, Sattizahn worked as a UX researcher at Meta Platforms. During his six-year tenure, he held senior roles leading integrity research for Facebook Marketplace, Facebook's Faith initiative, and ranking. In 2022, he transitioned to the Reality Labs division, where he served as a senior researcher focused on safety & integrity for Virtual reality (VR) hardware.

== Whistleblowing and public disclosures ==
=== September 9, 2025, U.S. Senate Testimony ===
In September 2025, Sattizahn and five other researchers – comprising both current and past Meta employees – came forward as a group to allege that Meta systematically manipulated, suppressed or erased internal research regarding harms to Meta's users and children. Represented by the legal non-profit Whistleblower Aid, the group filed a detailed disclosure and provided a trove of internal documents to Congress, the Securities and Exchange Commission (SEC), and the Federal Trade Commission (FTC).

On September 9, 2025, Sattizahn and fellow whistleblower Cayce Savage provided sworn testimony before the Senate Judiciary Subcommittee on Privacy, Technology, and the Law in a hearing titled "Hidden Harms". Their testimony alleged that Meta took severe Legal Intervention against Research at the company following the 2021 release of "The Facebook Files" by Frances Haugen. Testimony detailed that Meta's legal department intervened in research to "lock down" information through what Sattizahn described as a "funnel manipulation put on research". Researchers were reportedly instructed to include lawyers in their work so Meta's Legal team could determine what and how research was performed, how to write research findings (write vaguely, avoiding terms like "illegal" or "not compliant") and protect Meta from potential findings being seen by "adverse parties" via attorney-client privilege.

The testimony provided extensive details regarding Meta's actions, including:

- Suppression and Deletion of Evidence: Sattizahn testified that Meta "systematically covered up" harms by manipulating and erasing data that Meta deemed unfavorable, and that Meta had required researchers to delete data that showed harm to kids occurring on Meta's platforms.
- Prioritizing Profits over Safety: Sattizahn stated that Meta "deliberately compromising internal processes, policies, and research to protect company profits over their users, and stated that Meta knowingly ignored child safety because "children drive profits". Sattizahn and Savage both testified that Meta lacked adequate data regarding the actual ages of its users, allowing many children under 13 to remain on the platform to maintain high metrics and claimed that the company avoided safety measures that would decrease user engagement, monetization, or ad revenue.
- Hostile Research Environment: Researchers were reportedly told to avoid performing research and work that might produce evidence of child harm. Sattizahn also testified that Meta's legal team threatened their careers to get researchers to follow the Meta Legal team's reportedly inappropriate instructions, stating that one Meta lawyer told him "You wouldn't want to have to testify publicly if this research was to get out, would you?"

=== Testimony in Lawsuits against Meta Platforms, Inc. ===
Following the September 2025 disclosure to the U.S. Senate, the state of New Mexico deposed Sattizahn, seeking his testimony regarding claims that Meta engaged in unfair and deceptive practices by misrepresenting Meta's platforms as safe despite contrary internal knowledge. Meta attempted to block Sattizahn's testimony from the court room, but a judge approved Sattizahn to testify in upcoming trials against Meta.

==== State of New Mexico v. Meta Platforms ====
In February 2026, Sattizahn testified in the State of New Mexico v. Meta Platforms, Inc. a case that alleged Meta not only knowingly harmed children's mental health, but that Meta concealed what it knew about child sexual exploitation across its platforms. In his testimony, Sattizahn shared how Meta used lawyers as oversight on every stage of research, including requiring the deletion of data on children sexual exploitation.

Although the focus of Sattizahn's testimony was Meta's illicit research practices, Meta used part of their cross-examination to ask Sattizahn to reveal the identities of two other Meta whistleblowers who were at the time anonymous. Sattizahn refused, citing whistleblower anonymity and protections provided by U.S. Congress. When Meta later fired these two whistleblowers, Senator Chuck Grassley sent an inquiry to Meta out of concern for these two whistleblowers, Meta whistleblower Sarah Wynn-Williams and allegations of, " Meta’s alleged continued retaliation of whistleblowers."

The New Mexico jury found that Meta did prioritize profits over safety, violating parts of New Mexico's Unfair Practices Act. The court later labeled Meta a "public nuisance" and fined Meta a total of $942 million.

==== State of Tennessee v. Meta Platforms Inc. ====
In August 2026, Sattizahn took the stand in State of Tennessee v. Meta Platforms Inc., et al., a case arguing that Meta put company profits over the safety of young Instagram users and violated the Tennessee Consumer Protection Act by not fairly presenting the risks of Instagram. When testifying, Sattizahn shared that at Meta, "Engagement and profit was seen as something directly contrasting with safety" and that as Meta researchers, "We were told in various instances what types of information we could put in reports, what types of words we could use."

Before the trial ended and a verdict could be reached, this lawsuit was settled alongside People of the State of California v. Meta Platforms, Inc..

==== People of the State of California v. Meta Platforms, Inc. ====
Despite Meta's attempts to block his testimony, Sattizahn was also called to testify in People of the State of California v. Meta Platforms, Inc., a Federal lawsuit again arguing that Meta had misrepresented the safety of their platforms. On August 26, 2026, this lawsuit reached a settlement mid-trial that resulted in Meta paying up to $16.7 billion across 47 U.S. states, as well as making design changes to assist the safety of Facebook and Instagram users under the age of 18.

=== Additional actions ===
On September 18, 2025, Sattizahn joined the online safety advocate group the Heat Initiative at Meta's New York office to raise awareness of Meta's prioritization of profits over child and user safety. Sattizahn claimed that Meta had systematically hidden knowledge of harm to Meta's users, and also discussed the impact that Meta's culture had on employees. This included a story of Meta's alleged indifference to an employee suicide that happened feet from Sattizahn's car in the parking lot of Meta's California headquarters.

On July 30, 2026, Sattizahn and fellow whistleblower Cayce Savage were guest speakers at the U.S. Environmental Protection Agency and presented in honor of Whistleblower Appreciation Day. Sattizahn and Savage shared with employees their whistleblowing experience and how their actions encouraged public demand for oversight of Meta Platforms, Inc. They also offered advice and insights for anyone who ever finds themselves in a similar situation.

On September 17, 2026, Sattizahn testified to the Monopoly Busters Caucus, a Congressional caucus co-chaired by House Representatives Pramila Jayapal and Chris Deluzio. The hearing examined the harms of Artificial intelligence (AI), focusing on AI's surveillance of American citizens, the harm of surveillance and how surveillance drives corporate profit. Sattizahn testified to aggressive tactics corporations use to exhaustively gather user data, the value this has in training AI and the lack of control that consumers have to say no to AI. Mirroring his earlier Senate testimony, Sattizahn also stressed that for consumer and user safety, tech companies should not be allowed to regulate themselves.
