= Richard Levernier =

American nuclear whistleblower

Richard Levernier is an American nuclear whistleblower.

Levernier worked for 23 years as a nuclear security professional, and identified security problems at U.S. nuclear facilities as part of his job. Specifically, after 9/11, he identified problems with contingency planning to protect US nuclear plants from terrorist attacks. He said that the assumption that attackers would both enter and exit from facilities was not valid, since suicide terrorists would not need to exit. In response to this complaint, the U.S. Department of Energy withdrew Levernier's security clearance and he was assigned to clerical work. Levernier approached the United States Office of Special Counsel (OSC), which handles US federal whistleblower matters. It took the OSC four years to vindicate Levernier, ruling that the department's retaliation was illegal – but the OSC could not reinstate Levernier's security clearance, so he was unable to regain work in nuclear security.

== See also ==
- List of nuclear whistleblowers
- Nuclear safety
- George Galatis
- Nuclear whistleblowers
- Vulnerability of nuclear plants to attack
