= Gregory Minor =

American engineer and activist (died 1999)

Gregory Charles Minor (died 1999) was one of three American middle-management engineers (known as the GE Three) who resigned from the General Electric nuclear reactor division in 1976 to protest against the use of nuclear power in the United States. A native of Fresno, California, Minor received a BS degree in electrical engineering from the University of California in 1960. He gained an MS degree at Stanford University in 1966. He began working for G.E. in 1960 and died of leukemia in 1999.

All three of the engineers were members of the Creative Initiative Foundation, a California group that "seeks to strengthen human relations" and "change the world for the better". The engineers' resignations were coordinated by another CIF member, who helped them orchestrate the announcement for maximum effect.

Gregory Minor said that he had developed "a deep conviction that nuclear reactors and nuclear weapons now present a serious danger to the future of all life on this planet".

== See also ==
- GE Three
- List of nuclear whistleblowers
- Nuclear accidents in the United States
- Nuclear safety in the United States
- Richard Levernier
