= GE Three =

Group of American nuclear engineers and whistleblowers

The GE Three are three nuclear engineers who "blew the whistle" on safety problems at nuclear power plants in the United States in 1976. The three nuclear engineers gained the attention of journalists and the anti-nuclear movement. The GE Three returned to prominence in 2011 during the Fukushima Daiichi nuclear disaster.

== The "GE Three" ==
On February 2, 1976, Gregory C. Minor, Richard B. Hubbard, and Dale G. Bridenbaugh "blew the whistle" on safety problems at nuclear power plants. The three engineers gained the attention of journalists, and their disclosures about the threats of nuclear power had a significant impact. They timed their statements to coincide with their resignations from responsible positions in General Electric's nuclear energy division, and later established themselves as consultants on the nuclear power industry for state governments, federal agencies, and overseas governments. The consulting firm they formed, MHB Technical Associates, was technical advisor for the movie "The China Syndrome." The three engineers participated in Congressional hearings which their disclosures precipitated.

== Japan ==
Following the 2011 Tōhoku earthquake and tsunami that devastated northern Japan, a series of explosions and a containment failure at the Fukushima I Nuclear Power Plant resulted in media coverage of the GE Three. Bridenbaugh described design flaws of General Electric's Mark 1 reactors, which account for five of the six reactors at the Fukushima 1 power plant. Bridenbaugh claimed that the design "did not take into account the dynamic loads that could be experienced with a loss of coolant" and that, despite efforts to retrofit the reactors, "the Mark 1 is still a little more susceptible to an accident that would result in a loss of containment."

== See also ==
- Nuclear accidents in the United States
- Nuclear safety in the United States
- Anti-nuclear movement in the United States
- George Galatis
- List of nuclear whistleblowers
- David A. Schlissel
