= People of the State of California v. Meta Platforms, Inc. =

2023–2026 US lawsuit concerning Meta's social media platforms and children

- Court: United States District Court for the Northern District of California
- Full case name: People of the State of California, et al. v. Meta Platforms, Inc., et al.
- Started: 24 October 2023
- Decided: 26 August 2026
- Citation: No. 4:23-cv-05448-YGR

Court membership
- Judge sitting: Yvonne Gonzalez Rogers

People of the State of California v. Meta Platforms, Inc. was a federal lawsuit brought by California and other US states against Meta Platforms, alleging that the company designed Facebook and Instagram to encourage compulsive use by children and teenagers, misrepresented the safety of the platforms, and unlawfully collected personal information from children. The case was filed in the United States District Court for the Northern District of California in October 2023 and was part of multidistrict litigation concerning alleged harms caused by social media platforms.

The trial, before Judge Yvonne Gonzalez Rogers, began on 18 August 2026. Claims presented at the trial included allegations by 29 states that Meta had violated the Children's Online Privacy Protection Act (COPPA) by knowingly collecting children's data without parental consent, while California, Colorado, Kentucky and New Jersey also pursued claims under their state consumer-protection laws. Meta denied wrongdoing.

== Settlement ==
On 26 August 2026, the parties reached a settlement that ended the trial. Meta agreed to payments of up to approximately $16.7 billion to 47 states, the District of Columbia and three US territories (Puerto Rico, American Samoa and the Northern Mariana Islands), and to restrictions on the use of Facebook and Instagram by people under 18. Rogers approved the principal settlement later that day.

The agreement provides for a default two-hour daily limit for users under 18, a default block on use between midnight and 6 am, restrictions on notifications during school hours and at night, stronger parental controls and age-assurance measures, and restrictions on features including visible like counts and cosmetic-procedure image filters for minors. Some restrictions can become more stringent if other major social-media platforms adopt comparable protections.

The states had been expected to seek $200 billion.

== See also ==
- Lawsuits involving Meta Platforms
- Problematic social media use
