= Keith A. Schooley =

American author

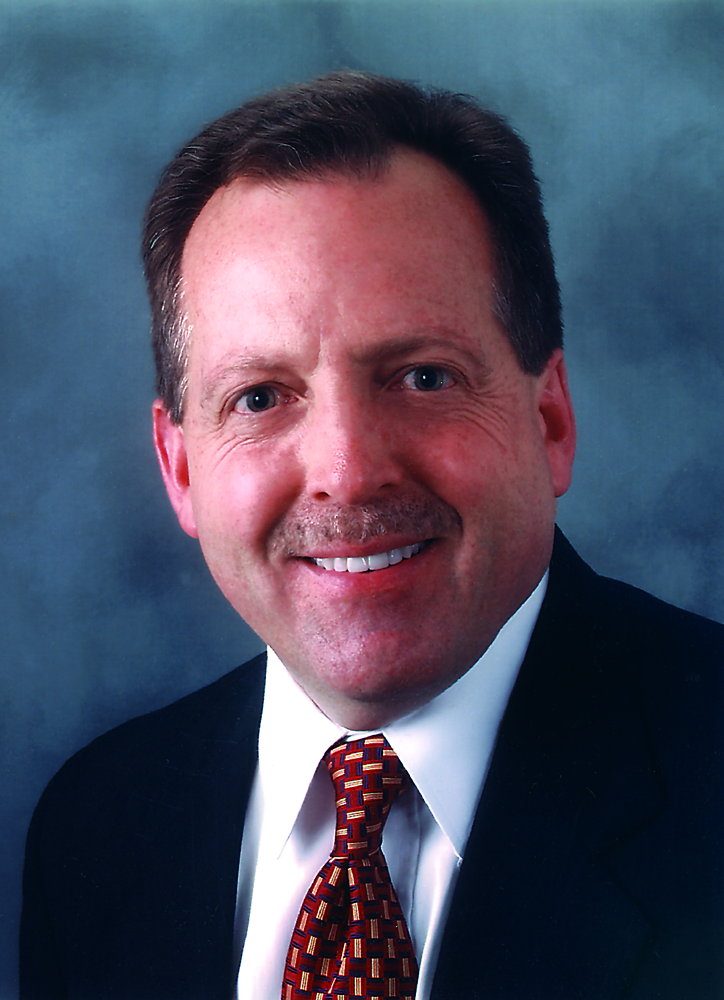
- Occupations: Author, stockbroker
- Known for: Whistle blowing on Merrill Lynch
- Notable work: Merrill Lynch: The Cost Could Be Fatal

Keith A. Schooley (born 1952) is an American author and former stockbroker at Merrill Lynch, who brought attention to fraud and corruption within the firm at the Oklahoma and Texas offices in 1992 as a whistleblower. As a result, he was terminated from the firm, and sued the corporation in a case that went to the Oklahoma Supreme Court, and Tenth Circuit Court of Appeals.

== Merrill Lynch case ==
Schooley, who was rated as a top broker in Enid, Oklahoma, discovered systemic wrongdoing at Merrill Lynch that ranged from brokers to management to the board of directors and included: License-related exam cheat sheets, Country club list theft, Embezzlement, Falsification of records, Failure of management to deliver millions in assets, Bond rating fraud, a Tour de France scheme, Client abuse, Perjuries, Conspiracies, and Cover-Ups.

Schooley first brought his findings to middle and then upper management citing the company guidelines: "...Improprieties should be reported to whatever level of management necessary to properly address the situation." Upon discovering that senior management covered up the wrongdoings in its first investigation, Schooley contacted Merrill Lynch’s 13-member board of directors with a detailed 31-page account.

Schooley was summoned by Merrill Lynch Vice Chairman and General Counsel Stephen Hammerman for a meeting at company headquarters, at the World Financial Center in New York where he was confronted by senior management and their attorneys. Schooley was terminated from his employment and subsequently sued Merrill Lynch, Pierce, Fenner & Smith for Wrongful Termination and was represented by, among others, attorney Stephen Jones. Schooley lost his case in arbitration and in subsequent courts. Murdock Global Advisers listed Schooley along with seven other very notable whistleblowers as a result of his actions.

=== Book ===
In 2002 Schooley wrote a book titled "Merrill Lynch: The Cost Could Be Fatal - My War Against Wall Street's Giant." Because Schooley was taking on a Fortune 500 corporation, Lloyd's of London declined a request to insure his book. The book was later translated into Chinese, republished in 2010, and released in Shanghai, China. In 2012, a fictionalized story "Robber Barons of the Big Board," was written as a screenplay by Chandra Niles Folsom about Schooley, and published as an e-book. In 2014, as judicial interest in the case against Merrill Lynch grew, interest in Folsom's screenplay increased as well.

=== Subsequent cases ===
Schooley’s charges against the firm were the first in a series of allegations of wrongdoings that resulted in an investigation conducted by New York State Attorney General Eliot Spitzer in 2001 that concluded in precedent-setting settlements, and subsequent class action lawsuits; as well as settlements with the Department of Justice, and the ultimate absorption of the firm into Bank of America in 2009.

== Early life and education ==
Schooley was born in Oklahoma City, the son of a local mayor and a church volunteer. He graduated from the University of Oklahoma with a B.B.A. in Petroleum Land Management in 1977, and from Oklahoma State University with an M.B.A. in 1978.

== Career ==
Schooley was a “wildcatter” in the oil and gas business during the oil boom of the late 1970s, and continued through the 1980s into the 1990s before going to work for Merrill Lynch. Schooley is currently involved in the acquisition of oil and gas leases and owns interests in various oil and gas producing properties.

== Personal life ==
Schooley was married in 1981 to Donna Long in Garber, Oklahoma and later divorced. He has a son and a daughter.

== Published works ==
- Merrill Lynch: The Cost Could Be Fatal - My War Against Wall Street’s Giant, 2002, Lakepointe Publishing, ISBN 0-9716103-6-3;
- (Chinese edition) Merrill Lynch: The Cost Could Be Fatal - My War Against Wall Street’s Giant, 2010, Shanghai University of Finance and Economics Press (SUFEP), The World Classics of Investment series, ISBN 978-7-5642-0658-1/F.0658.

== Bibliography ==
- Schooley, Keith (2002). Merrill Lynch:The Cost Could Be Fatal - My War Against Wall Street's Giant. Lakepointe Publishing. p. 44. ISBN 0-9716103-63.
