= Renee Dufault =

American research scientist and whistleblower

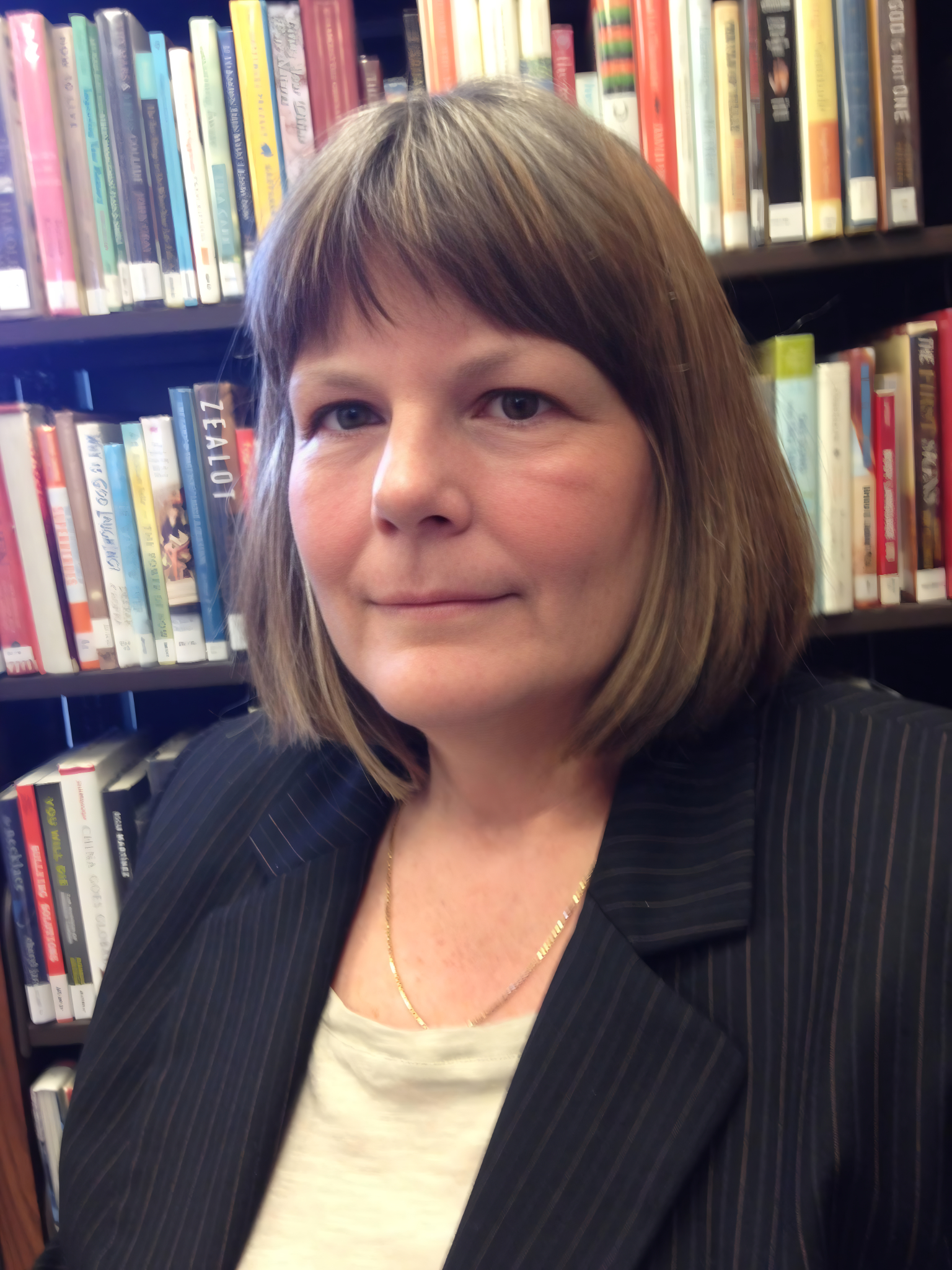
- self-portrait, 2025
- Education: A.T. Still University (D.H.Ed.), University of Maryland (M.A.), University of California, Davis (B.S.)
- Occupation: Public Health Service Officer
- Employer(s): FDA, EPA, NIH
- Known for: Whistleblower; Macroepigenetics

Renee Dufault is an American research scientist and whistleblower. She is a former Food and Drug Administration researcher and the founder of the Food Ingredient and Health Research Institute. She published a study about mercury in high fructose corn syrup.

== Education ==
Dufault earned her Doctorate of Health Education (D.H.Ed.) degree from A.T. Still University in Missouri, and a B.S. in the Environmental Sciences from the University of California Davis (UCD).

== Career ==
Dufault served in the Army and Navy before transferring to the United States Public Health Service.

During her federal career, Dufault worked for the National Institutes of Health, the Environmental Protection Agency, Shoshone-Paiute Tribes and the Food and Drug Administration.

In 2004, Dufault began researching the mercury cycle on behalf of the FDA, which involved, analyzing a number of food products listing HFCS as either the first or second ingredient on the label.

Dufault learned mercury cell caustic soda was used to manufacture lye, which was used to separate corn starch from corn kernels during the production of high-fructose corn syrup. Dufault enlisted the help of several colleagues to test whether high fructose corn syrup or products containing high fructose corn syrup contained trace amounts of mercury.

While her research team initially tested only 20 samples, 45% of the samples contained trace amounts of mercury. Dufault then sent additional virgin samples of HFCS to two different laboratories, in order to independently confirm her results. Acting as third parties, the federal and academic laboratories tested and independently verified the presence of low levels of mercury in the HFCS samples and foods containing HFCS.

In October 2005, Dufault, and her extramural academic colleagues presented their preliminary findings to the FDA's Center for Food Safety and Applied Nutrition (CFSAN). At that time, Dufault was asked to halt the investigation. In 2006, Dufault attempted to publish the findings of her research on mercury levels contained within HFCS, but was denied the usage of the federal extramural data.

She quit her position in 2008, citing her intention to make her research public, and a belief that the FDA no longer supported her work. Dufault and her collaborators published their findings of mercury in HFCS in 2009.

Dufault developed and published a scientific model to explain the side effects of HFCS consumption called "macroepigenetics". This model describes the dietary factors that impact gene behavior in the human body to bring about conditions of autism or ADHD.

Dufault also developed a nutritional epigenetics model for autism in 2009 concerning the impact of dietary mercury (Hg) exposure on the metallothionein (MT) gene when children zinc (Zn) deficient. The model was used in a pilot study in 2024.

After leaving the FDA in 2008, Dufault founded the Food Ingredient and Health Research Institute, a non-profit that advocates for food ingredient safety, better food, and nutrition education and research.

In 2017, Dufault published the book Unsafe at Any Meal: What the FDA Does Not Want You to Know About the Foods You Eat.

== Bibliography ==
- Dufault, R. J. (2017). Unsafe at Any Meal: What the FDA Does Not Want You to Know About the Foods You Eat. Simon & Schuster. ISBN 9780757004360.
- Dufault, R.J. (2023). Nutritional Epigenetics: Unsafe At Any Meal Study Guide. ISBN 9798392540976.

== Select publications ==
- Dufault, Renee; Lukiw, Walter J; Crider, Raquel; Schnoll, Roseanne; Wallinga, David; Deth, Richard (2012). "A macroepigenetic approach to identify factors responsible for the autism epidemic in the United States". Clinical Epigenetics. 4 (1) 6. doi:10.1186/1868-7083-4-6. ISSN 1868-7075. PMC 3378453. PMID 22490277.
- Hoover, E.; Cook, K.; Plain, R.; Sanchez, K.; Waghiyi, V.; Miller, P.; Dufault, R. (2012). "Indigenous peoples of North America: environmental exposures and reproductive justice". Environmental Health Perspectives. 120 (12): 1645–1649. Bibcode:2012EnvHP.120.1645H. doi:10.1289/ehp.1205422 (inactive 20 April 2026). PMC 3548285. PMID 22899635.
- Dufault, R.J.; Wolle, M.M.; Kingston, Skip H.M.; Gilbert, Steven G.; Murray, Joseph A. (2021). "Connecting inorganic mercury and lead measurements in blood to dietary sources of exposure that may impact child development". World Journal of Methodology. 11 (4): 144–159. doi:10.5662/wjm.v11.i4.144. PMC 8299913. PMID 34322366.
