= Institut national de recherche et de sécurité =

French association

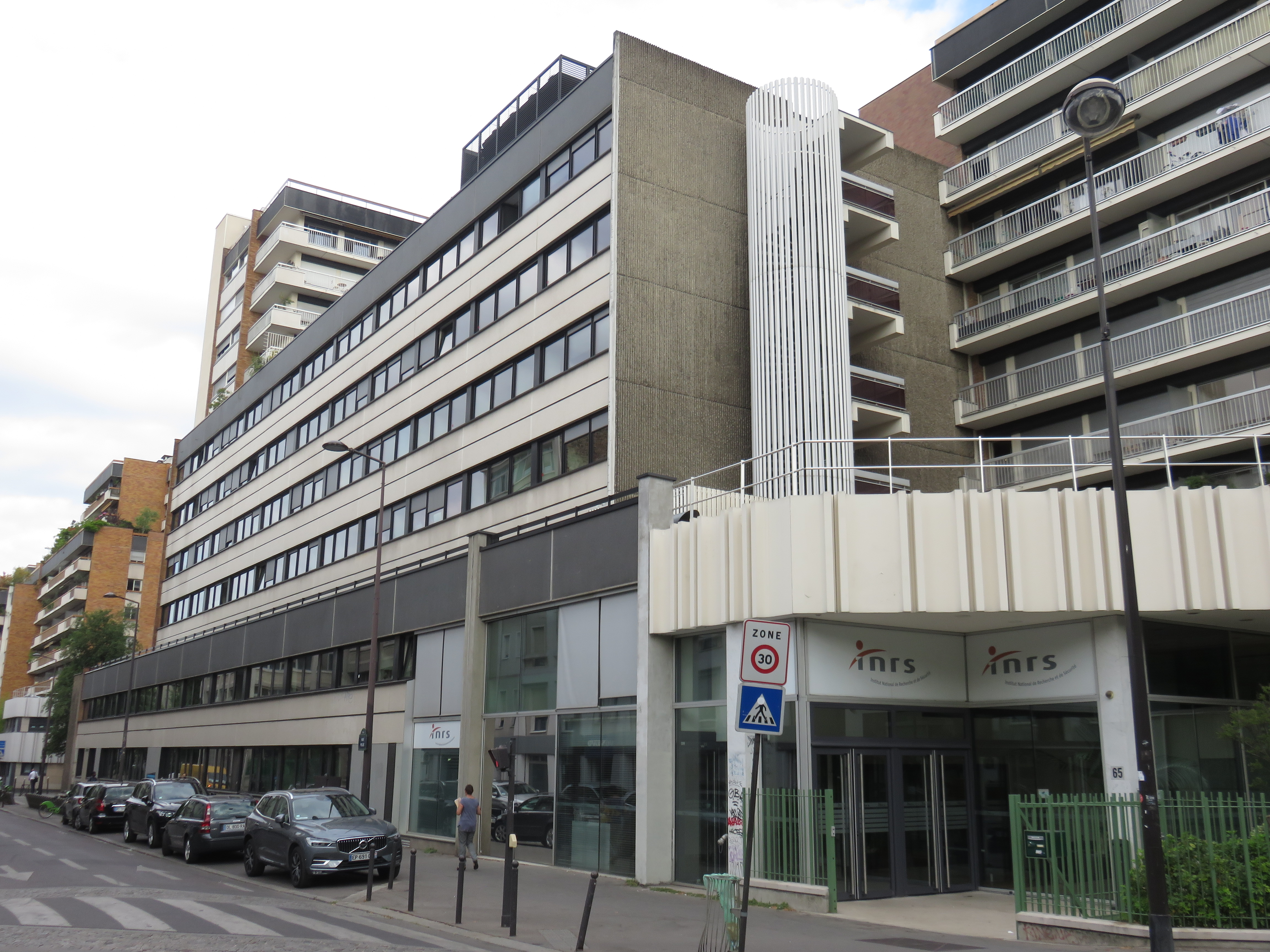
INRS headquarters in Paris in 2018

INRS building in Nancy in 2018

The French National Research and Safety Institute for the Prevention of Occupational Accidents and Diseases (French: Institut national de recherche et de sécurité, INRS) is a French association. It works under the auspices of the Caisse nationale de l'assurance maladie des travailleurs salariés (National Health Insurance Fund). Its board is composed of equal parts of representatives of employers and representatives of the unions.

== Functions ==
The main tasks of the INRS are:

- Conduct studies and research in the areas of safety and working conditions
- Publish reports to improve the health and safety of people at work
- Train technicians in prevention

It produces and distributes many information media such as magazines (Travail et sécurité) to the professional world. It also has a role of expertise and training to improve safety conditions.

Platformization 2027: consequences of uberization on occupational health and safety. The summary of the results highlights a number of points for vigilance and opportunities in terms of occupational risk prevention.

== Members ==
- Active:
  - French Democratic Confederation of Labour
  - French Confederation of Management – General Confederation of Executives
  - French Confederation of Christian Workers
  - General Confederation of Labour
  - General Confederation of Labour - Workers' Force
  - Mouvement des Entreprises de France
  - Professional Artisan Union (Union professionnelle artisanale)
  - General Confederation of Small and Medium Enterprises (Confédération Générale des Petites et Moyennes Entreprises)
- Members of law:
  - Director of the Directorate General of Labour
  - The Director of Social Security representing the Minister of Social Affairs
  - The budget director representing the Minister for the Budget
  - Director of the National Health Insurance Fund for employees
  - The Comptroller General Economic and Financial close INRS
