= List of nuclear whistleblowers =

There have been a number of nuclear whistleblowers, often nuclear engineers, who have identified safety concerns about nuclear power and nuclear weapons production. That list is partial and non-exhaustive.

== List ==
Name	Year	Company	Action	Additional Links
John Pace	1959		In 1959, John Pace was employed at the Santa Susana Field Laboratory, 36 miles from Los Angeles, at the time of the partial meltdown during the Sodium Reactor Experiment. According to Pace, the reactor building doors and reactor exhaust stack were opened, releasing radiation into the atmosphere. Dan Parks also worked at the Santa Susana Field Lab, as a health physicist in the 1960s, where he witnessed the burning of radioactive waste in burn pits, and frequently saw workers illegally vent radiation into the atmosphere. In 2015 they spoke out about the incident in an investigative report by NBC News.	
Dan Parks	1959			
Karen Silkwood	1974	Kerr-McGee	The first prominent nuclear whistleblower was Karen Silkwood, who worked as a chemical technician at a Kerr-McGee nuclear fuel plant. Silkwood became an activist in the Oil, Chemical and Atomic Workers International Union in order to protest health and safety issues. In 1974, she testified to the United States Atomic Energy Commission about her concerns. A few months later she died in a car crash under mysterious conditions on the way to a meeting with a New York Times reporter and a national union leader. The 1983 film Silkwood is an account of this story.	Main article: Karen Silkwood
Gregory C. Minor	1976	General Electric	On 2 February 1976, Gregory C. Minor, Richard B. Hubbard, and Dale G. Bridenbaugh (the GE Three) blew the whistle on safety problems at nuclear power plants, their action has been called "an exemplary instance of whistleblowing". The three engineers gained the attention of journalists and their disclosures about the threats of nuclear power had a significant impact. They timed their statements to coincide with their resignations from responsible positions in General Electric's nuclear energy division, and later established themselves as consultants on the nuclear power industry for state governments, federal agencies, and overseas governments. The consulting firm they formed, MHB Technical Associates, was technical advisor for the movie The China Syndrome. The three engineers participated in Congressional hearings which their disclosures precipitated. Browns Ferry nuclear power plant construction began in 1966. It was located in Alabama and in 1967 it earned a federal construction permit. The plant received new design standards which call for "physical separation of electrical cables." There was an issue with the instructions on how to accomplish this so the AEC inspector F.U. Bower requested that the AEC elaborate; however, there was no response from the organization and installation went on. Still, no instructions were issued after five failed inspections in 1970. The lack of cable separation instructions led to the sacrifice of safety coolant systems in two of the units in order to improve one with severe safety violation. The ignorance of the AEC led to the fire that occurred on 22 March 1975, that almost led to a radiation leak. The substance separating the wires caught fire when tests to find air leaks with a candle ignited it thus resulting in damage to the control systems. The fire was extinguished when a local fireman asked that he be allowed to "put a little water on it." With damage to the control systems, the cooling system that keeps the units from leaking radiation did not work properly. Somehow the situation was avoided and the units were put out of service. Throughout the occurrence of these events Bridenbaugh had been discussing his reservations on the safety at the plant in vain and in 1976 a year later Bridenbaugh, Hubbard and Minor resigned.	Main article: GE Three Browns Ferry Unit 1 under construction
Richard B. Hubbard	1976	General Electric		Main article: GE Three Browns Ferry Unit 1 under construction
Dale G. Bridenbaugh	1976	General Electric		Main article: GE Three Browns Ferry Unit 1 under construction
Lou Putney		Duke Energy	Lou Putney came on the scene of the Crystal River 3 plant after receiving a call from a plant engineer. The engineer claimed that the managers hired engineers based on "good ol' boy mentality." The plant had experienced numerous shut downs since 1978. Along with this concern, the engineer was not confident that the manager possessed the qualifications to be a manager. Although the engineer pursued nothing further with his complaint, it prompted Putney to purchase shares of stock in the company that would allow him to file "shareholder resolutions." Putney had looked into the nuclear reactors that were built of an unsafe material for emergency cooling procedures. The NRC had placed Crystal River on the top 14 worst reactors list because of this. So, the shares were purchased in 1981, which is when Putney filed his first shareholder resolution requesting the plant be shut down. This tradition was upheld by Putney for seven years until he was required to purchase more stock in order to continue filing resolutions. Over the course of sixteen years, Putney filed a total of fourteen shareholder resolutions. All of these resolutions were ignored and were met with offers to buy out his shares so he could no longer file the resolutions. The plant was officially decommissioned in September 2009.	Main article: Crystal River 3 Nuclear Power Plant
Ronald Goldstein	1985	General Electric	Ronald J. Goldstein was a supervisor employed by EBASCO, a major contractor for the construction of the South Texas plants. In the summer of 1985, Goldstein identified safety problems to SAFETEAM, an internal compliance program established by EBASCO and Houston Lighting, including noncompliance with safety procedures, the failure to issue safety compliance reports, and quality control violations affecting the safety of the plant. SAFETEAM was promoted as an independent safe haven for employees to voice their safety concerns. The two companies did not inform their employees that they did not believe complaints reported to SAFETEAM had any legal protection. After he filed his report to SAFETEAM, Goldstein was fired. Subsequently, Goldstein filed suit under federal nuclear whistleblower statutes. The U.S. Department of Labor ruled that his submissions to SAFETEAM were protected and his dismissal was invalid, a finding upheld by Labor Secretary Lynn Martin. The ruling was appealed and overturned by the Fifth Circuit Court of Appeals, which ruled that private programs offered no protection to whistleblowers. After Goldstein lost his case, Congress amended the federal nuclear whistleblower law to provide protection reports made to internal systems and prevent retaliation against whistleblowers.	
Lisa Crawford	1985	Fernald Feed Materials Production Center	The Fernald Feed Materials Production Center was built in Crosby Township, Ohio in 1951, and decommissioned in 1989. Fernald processed uranium trioxide and uranium tetrafluoride, among other radioactive materials, to produce the uranium fuel cores for nuclear weapons. It was shrouded in suspicion with many manager changes and the people of the town ill-informed of the purpose of the plant. The Fernald Feed Materials Production Center also conducted an evaluation of how much material was contaminated by Radium. Using 138 pieces of the CR-39 film assays, they were able to determine that people working in the area where K-65 silos (underground chambers used to store missiles) had lower levels of exposure of materials contaminated by Radon than the Q-11 silos between the period of 1952-1988 Journal of Exposure Science and Environmental Epidemiology. From 1951 to 1995, the plant had numerous scandals including faking numbers for contamination and disregarding evidence of ground water pollution. Among the citizens affected by the pollution was Mrs. Lisa Crawford who took action. Crawford and other residents filed a lawsuit in 1985, and she became president of the organization. A lawsuit was then filed once again against Fernald by former employees several years later in 1990. After several years of being heavily advised not to blow the whistle, the workers earned themselves a $15 million settlement and lifelong medical monitoring. In 1992, FERMCO was hired to construct a cleanup plan for the plant and in 1996, around accusations of wasteful spending, the cleanup of ground water and soil was completed.	Main article: Fernald Feed Materials Production Center Aerial view of Fernald Feed Materials Production Center Uranium components fabricated at Fernald
Roger Wensil	1985	DuPont B.F. Shaw	Roger D. Wensil was America’s first nationally recognized whistleblower at a nuclear weapons facility. In 1985, Wensil worked as a pipe-fitter for Dupont B.F. Shaw Company, a subcontractor at the Savannah River Nuclear Weapons Facility in South Carolina. On the job, Wensil witnessed the use, sale, and distribution of illegal drugs among construction workers at the plant that handles highly radioactive nuclear waste. Concerned about the damage that those under the influence could cause, Wensil reported to his supervisors about the safety violations. He was dismissed six months after the disclosure. A month after Wensil left, he married Norma Morris, who worked for Shaw at the time. She alleged that she had been harassed and forced to leave her job because of her husband’s disclosure. Wensil filed a complaint with both the U.S. Department of Labor and the Department of Energy in 1986. The DOE upheld Wensil’s termination, but the DOL found credible evidence of safety violations and ruled that Wensil had been unfairly dismissed. Wensil was reinstated, but he again faced workplace retaliation and was forced out of his job three months after. Wensil’s case led to the passing of the nuclear weapon whistleblowers protection in 1992.	
Joy Adams	1985	DuPont B.F. Shaw	Joy P. Adams was terminated in retaliation after testifying in support of Roger Wensil, a whistleblower who disclosed safety violations at the federal Savannah River nuclear weapons facility in South Carolina.	
Mordechai Vanunu	1986	Negev Nuclear Research Center	Mordechai Vanunu blew the whistle on the nuclear plant in Dimona, Israel in an interview with The Sunday Times that was published on 5 October 1986. According to Vanunu, this plant had been producing nuclear weapons for 10 to 20 years. It is estimated that there may be around 200 nuclear weapons in possession of Israel's nuclear weapons program. Vanunu demonstrated his knowledge to Frank Barnaby and Theodore Taylor, and they confirmed the credibility of his story. Frank Barnaby wrote in his Declaration of Frank Barnaby in the Matter of Mordechai Vanunu that Vanunu had the bare minimum knowledge of nuclear physics that a technician should have and accurately described the makeup of the nuclear plant in Dimona. Having served in full his 18 years prison term, ruled in closed door trial, including 11 years in solitary Vanunu has been further in and out of jail after. In 2007, sentenced to six months for violating terms of his parole, and in May 2010, again to three months for having met foreigners in violation of his release terms from jail. Vanunu is ethnic Mizrahi Jew, born in Marrakesh Morocco, having emigrated to Israel, following its independence in 1948, like many of the North African Jewish community did. Amnesty International issued a press release on 2 July 2007, stating that "The organisation considers Mordechai Vanunu to be a prisoner of conscience and calls for his immediate and unconditional release." Vanunu has been characterized internationally as a whistleblower and by Israel as a traitor. Despite the whistle blown towards the operation of the nuclear weapons program in Israel, the Israeli government denied the existence of all allegations. Mordechai Vanunu is known as Israel`s Nuclear Whistleblower.	Mordechai Vanunu 2009
Chang Hsien-yi	1987	National Atomic Research Institute (Taiwan)	Chang served as deputy director of ROC's Institute of Nuclear Energy Research (INER) before defecting in 1988. Recruited by the CIA, he exposed the secret nuclear program of Taiwanese army to the United States and was consequently placed under witness protection. Chang's information led President Ronald Reagan to insist that Taiwan shut down its nuclear weapons program.	
Howard Samuel Nunn Jr.	1988	Duke Power Company	Howard Samuel Nunn Jr. blew the whistle on the Duke Power Company and filed a civil suit against the company after he was dismissed from the North Carolina plant in October 1983. He alleged that he was fired because of his engagement in protected activity while working as a welder at the plant - the protected activity consisted of voicing his concerns about quality control and safety issues at the plant. Nunn had contacted a public interest group about his concerns, and the issue deliberated if that action would be protected under the scope of protected activity. In 1987, Nunn’s case was remanded to the administrative law judge. The case ended in a settlement in April 1988.	
Joseph Macktal	1988	Halliburton Brown & Root	Macktal was an electrician for Halliburton Brown and Root (HB&R) who witnessed hazardous conditions during the construction of the Comanche Peak Nuclear Power Plant. After he reported the safety issues to HB&R, the company’s lawyers coerced him into signing a non-disclosure agreement that prohibited him from going to the Nuclear Regulatory Commission with his concerns. Macktal willfully violated his non-disclosure agreement, sparking a seven-year legal battle that resulted in the Department of Labor ultimately voiding his entire settlement agreement and allowing him to pursue his whistleblower case. Macktal’s case set a legal precedent for whistleblowers who reported safety violations within the nuclear industry by disallowing non-disclosure agreements.	
Arnold Gundersen	1990	Nuclear Energy Services	In 1990, Arnold Gundersen discovered radioactive material in an accounting safe at Nuclear Energy Services in Danbury, Connecticut, the consulting firm where he held a $120,000-a-year job as senior vice-president. Three weeks after he notified the company president of what he believed to be radiation safety violations, Gundersen was fired. According to The New York Times, for three years, Gundersen "was awakened by harassing phone calls in the middle of the night" and he "became concerned about his family's safety". Gundersen believes he was blacklisted, harassed and fired for doing what he thought was right. The New York Times reports that Gundersen's case is not uncommon, especially in the nuclear industry. Even though nuclear workers are encouraged to report potential safety hazards, those who do risk demotion and dismissal. Instead of correcting the problems, whistleblowers say, industry management and government agencies attack them as the cause of the problem. Driven out of their jobs and shunned by neighbors and co-workers, whistleblowers often turn to each other for support. The Whistleblower Support Fund is an organization that has compiled resources for whistleblowers to access if they are considering whistleblowing. It was founded by Donald Ray Soeken, who has counseled whistleblowers for 35 years. In addition, a social network to connect whistleblowers to other whistleblowers will be implemented. It will be a private discussion where whistleblowers can safely seek support.	Main article: Arnold Gundersen
Vera English	1990	General Electric Company	Vera English was employed as a lab technician at a nuclear facility operated by General Electric Company (GE). English was terminated after exposing widespread radioactive contamination in the facility. Her Supreme Court case, English v. General Electric Company, set precedent that allowed whistleblowers to pursue cases under state law. Her victory also demonstrated the application of whistleblower protection legislation in cases of whistleblowing in nuclear energy cases.	
David Lochbaum	1990		In the early 1990s, nuclear engineer David Lochbaum and a colleague Don Prevatte identified a safety problem in a plant where they were working, but were ignored when they raised the issue with the plant manager, the utility and the U.S. Nuclear Regulatory Commission (NRC). After bringing their concerns to Congress, the problem was corrected not just at the original nuclear plant but at plants across the country.	Main article: David Lochbaum
Don Prevatte	1990		In the early 1990s, nuclear engineer David Lochbaum and a colleague Don Prevatte identified a safety problem in a plant where they were working, but were ignored when they raised the issue with the plant manager, the utility and the U.S. Nuclear Regulatory Commission (NRC). After bringing their concerns to Congress, the problem was corrected not just at the original nuclear plant but at plants across the country.	
Linda Mitchell	1992	Arizona Public Safety Company	While working at the Palo Verde Nuclear Generating Station, Mitchell blew the whistle on the Arizona Public Service Company, which owned the generating station. In 1985, Mitchel reported various safety concerns she had at Palo Verde to the Nuclear Regulatory Commission and continued to bring up concerns to management about concerns regarding computer programs the facility used and the layout of the plant. Mitchell filed a complaint in 1989 to the NRC, alleging that the Arizona Public Service Co. tried to suppress an NRC investigator’s findings of safety issues at Palo Verde. She was subjected to severe harassment in the workplace and in her personal life and won a Department of Labor discrimination lawsuit in 1992. In 1994, Mitchell was granted permission to have an administrative public hearing before the NRC’s Atomic Safety and Licensing Board; she also asked for the three units at Palo Verde to be halted to 0% power until a review of the work environment could be conducted.	
Sarah Thomas	1993	Arizona Public Service Company	Arizona Public Service Company (APS) employee Sarah Thomas was harassed and retaliated against by her supervisor after she raised concern regarding safety and regulatory violation that occurred in her workplace. She filed a complaint with the Department of Labor concerning the safety violations, failure to promote, and harassment on the job. APS was ordered to promote Thomas to Senior Test Technician and provide compensation for damages she suffered as the result of discriminatory treatment.	
Alan Mosbaugh	1995		Mosbaugh reported safety concerns at Georgia Power Company in 1990 when he worked at the Vogtle Electric Generating Plant as a superintendent of engineering liaison. In 1989, he sent the Nuclear Regulatory Commission a memo about a "violation of technical specifications" in regards to specific valves at the plant. In September 1990, Mosbaugh joined Marvin Hobby in petitioning the Nuclear Regulatory Commission to conduct a review of the Georgia Power Company and impose civil penalties for improper operation at the facility and illegally transferring control to the Southern Nuclear Operating Company. Mosbaugh also recorded his coworkers and superiors that documented safety violations. He was discharged from his job in October 1990 and filed a complaint alleging that his firing was an act of whistleblower retaliation under the Energy Reorganization Act of 1974, but the administrative law judge ruled in 1992 that Georgia Power Company had not acted in retaliation. In 1993, the Nuclear Regulatory Commission issued a report that supported Mosbaugh’s whistleblower retaliation claim. In 1995, the Secretary of Labor concluded that Mosbaugh had been retaliated against after he engaged in "protected activity," which reversed the 1992 ruling.	
Shannon Doyle	1996	Hydro Nuclear Services	In 1983, Shannon Doyle resigned from his job as a nuclear operator and decontamination technician at the Farley Nuclear Generating Station in Alabama after reported safety issues. In 1988, Doyle then applied to several other jobs and was eventually contacted by the Westinghouse subsidiary Hydro Nuclear Services, to be a casual employee. As part of the hiring process, Hydro Nuclear Services required Doyle to sign a release regarding past employment records. When Doyle refused to sign the papers, the company chose not to hire him. In 1989, Doyle filed a complaint with the Department of Labor alleging that Hydro Nuclear Services violated the Energy Reorganization Act when the company did not hire him as a casual employee. In 1995, an administrative law judge ruled that Hydro Nuclear Services pay Doyle in back pay, compensatory damages, and clear all of the negative information from Doyle’s personnel record. In 2000, Hydro Nuclear Services and Westinghouse filed a memorandum to dismiss Doyle’s complaint. In March 2002, the U.S. Court of Appeals Third Circuit dismissed Doyle’s request that the Administrative Review Board pay a tax enhancement for receiving back pay in a previous decision. The Supreme Court affirmed the Third Circuit’s decision in October 2002.	
George Galatis	1996	Northeast Utilities	George Galatis was a senior nuclear engineer and whistleblower who reported safety problems at the Millstone 1 Nuclear Power Plant, relating to reactor refueling procedures, in 1996. The unsafe procedures meant that spent fuel rod pools at Unit 1 had the potential to boil, possibly releasing radioactive steam throughout the plant. Galatis eventually took his concerns to the Nuclear Regulatory Commission, to find that they had "known about the unsafe procedures for years". As a result of going to the NRC, Galatis experienced "subtle forms of harassment, retaliation, and intimidation".	Main article: George Galatis
Rainer Moormann	1976	Helmholtz Association of German Research Centres	Rainer Moormann is a German chemist and nuclear power whistleblower. Since 1976 he has been working at the Forschungszentrum Jülich, doing research on safety problems with pebble bed reactors, fusion power and spallation neutron sources. In 2008 Moormann published a critical paper on the safety of pebble bed reactors, which raised attention among specialists in the field, and managed to distribute it via the media, facing considerable opposition. For doing this despite the occupational disadvantages he had to accept as a consequence, Moormann was awarded the whistleblower award of the Federation of German Scientists (VDW) and of the German section of the International Association of Lawyers Against Nuclear Arms (IALANA).	Rainer Moormann in 2004
Marvin Hobby	2002	Georgia Power Company	Marvin Hobby was a top ranking corporate officer at Georgia Power Company who reported safety issues at nuclear power plants. In 1989, Hobby informed upper management at Georgia Power Co. that they were not following government policies as it prepared to turn over control of a plant in Waynesboro, Georgia. A few months later, Hobby was removed from his position. In 1995, the Secretary of Labor issued a decision that found Georgia Power Company guilty of violating the whistleblower protection provisions of the Energy Reorganization Act of 1974 when they fired Hobby. Twelve years after reporting his concerns, Hobby was paid $4 million by Georgia Power Co. for his efforts.	
Setsuo Fujiwara	2009	Hokkaido Electric Power Company	Setsuo Fujiwara, who used to design reactors, said he clashed with supervisors over an inspection audit he conducted in March 2009 at the Tomari nuclear plant in Japan. Fujiwara refused to approve a routine test by the plant's operator, Hokkaido Electric Power, saying the test was flawed. A week later, he was summoned by his supervisor, who ordered him to correct his written report to indicate that the test had been done properly. After Fujiwara refused, his employment contract was not renewed. "They told me my job was just to approve reactors, not to raise doubts about them", said Fujiwara, 62, who is now suing the nuclear safety organization to get rehired. In a written response to questions from The New York Times, the agency said it could not comment while the court case was under way. Along with the lawsuit Mr. Fujiwara filed against the agency he used to work for, he had gone to the Tokyo District Court to further write several complaints about how the JNES (Japan Nuclear Energy Safety Organization) failed to follow the UN laws concerning how to properly inspect nuclear energy reactors. Mr. Fujiwara also submitted several documents and emails that dealt with how the reactor inspections were improperly handled by JNES even though JNES denies all allegations.	
Walter Tamosaitis	2011	AECOM	The Hanford site resulted in a number of whistleblowers during the efforts to clean the site up. Walter Tamosaitis blew the whistle on the Energy Department's plan for waste treatment at the Hanford site in 2011. Tamosaitis's concern was the possibility of explosive hydrogen gas being built up inside tanks that the company was to store the harmful chemical sludge they were trying to put into hibernation for its chemical life. Shortly after this Tamosaitis was demoted and two years later, fired which triggered his lawsuit for wrongful termination. A $4.1 million settlement was offered to Tamosaitis from AECOM on 12 August 2015. Tamosaitis has since been reinstated. Donna Busche blew the whistle resulting in her 2013 lawsuit with claims that the URS "retaliated against her. She was head of nuclear safety and a URS employee around the time when she expressed her concerns. Gary Brunson reported 34 safety and engineering violations after quitting in 2012. Brunson was federal engineering chief before he quit. Shelly Doss earned "$20,000 in emotional distress and $10,000 in callous disregard of her rights" as well as reinstatement in 2014. Doss was an environmental specialist at the time of her firing in 2011 working for Washington River Protection Solutions.	
Larry Criscione	2012	Nuclear Regulatory Commission	In 2012, Larry Criscione and Richard H. Perkins publicly accused the U.S. Nuclear Regulatory Commission of downplaying flood risks for nuclear plants which are sited on waterways downstream from large reservoirs and dams. They are engineers with over 20 years of combined government and military service who work for the NRC. Other nuclear safety advocates have supported their complaints.	
Richard H. Perkins	2012	Nuclear Regulatory Commission	In 2012, Larry Criscione and Richard H. Perkins publicly accused the U.S. Nuclear Regulatory Commission of downplaying flood risks for nuclear plants which are sited on waterways downstream from large reservoirs and dams. They are engineers with over 20 years of combined government and military service who work for the NRC. Other nuclear safety advocates have supported their complaints.	

== Other nuclear whistleblowers ==
- Chuck Atkinson
- Dale G. Bridenbaugh
- Joe Carson
- Larry Criscione
- Mark Gillespie
- Lars-Olov Höglund
- Carl Hocevar
- David Hoffman
- Avon Hudson
- M Shafiqul Islam
- Carl Patrickson
- Richard H. Perkins
- Robert Pollard
- John P. Shannon
- Don Ranft
- Zhores Medvedev
- Ronald A. Sorri
- Grigoris Lambrakis

== See also ==
- Nuclear accidents in the United States
- Nuclear safety
- Anti-nuclear movement in the United States
