= Integrative neuroscience =

Cadiology

Integrative neuroscience is the study of neuroscience that works to unify functional organization data to better understand complex structures and behaviors. The relationship between structure and function, and how the regions and functions connect to each other. Different parts of the brain carrying out different tasks, interconnecting to come together allowing complex behavior. Integrative neuroscience works to fill gaps in knowledge that can largely be accomplished with data sharing, to create understanding of systems, currently being applied to simulation neuroscience: Computer Modeling of the brain that integrates functional groups together.

== Overview ==
The roots of integrative neuroscience originated from the Rashevsky-Rosen school of relational biology that characterizes functional organization mathematically by abstracting away the structure (i.e., physics and chemistry). It was further expanded by Chauvet who introduced hierarchical and functional integration.

Hierarchical integration is structural involving spatiotemporal dynamic continuity in Euclidean space to bring about functional organization, viz.

Hierarchical organization + Hierarchical integration = Functional organization

However, functional integration is relational and as such this requires a topology not restricted to Euclidean space, but rather occupying vector spaces This means that for any given functional organization the methods of functional analysis enable a relational organization to be mapped by the functional integration, viz.

Functional organization + Functional integration = Relational Organization

Thus hierarchical and functional integration entails a "neurobiology of cognitive semantics" where hierarchical organization is associated with the neurobiology and relational organization is associated with the cognitive semantics. Relational organization throws away the matter; "function dictates structure", hence material aspects are entailed, while in reductionism the causal nexus between structure and dynamics entails function that obviates functional integration because the causal entailment in the brain of hierarchical integration is absent from the structure.

If integrative neuroscience is studied from the viewpoint of functional organization of hierarchical levels then it is defined as causal entailment in the brain of hierarchical integration. If it is studied from the viewpoint of relational organization then it is defined as semantic entailment in the brain of functional integration.

It aims to present studies of functional organization of particular brain systems across scale through hierarchical integration leading to species-typical behaviors under normal and pathological states. As such, integrative neuroscience aims for a unified understanding of brain function across scale.

Spivey's continuity of mind thesis extends integrative neuroscience to the domain of continuity psychology.

== Motivation ==
With data building up, it ends up in its respective specializations with very little overlap. With the creation of a standardized integrated database of neuroscience data, lead to statical models that would otherwise not be possible, for example, understanding and treating psychiatric disorders.

It provides a framework for linking the great diversity of specializations within contemporary neuroscience, including

- Molecular neuroscience – genetic and cellular aspects of brain function
- Neuroanatomy – connections, networks, neurotransmitter systems
- Behavioral neuroscience – the overt consequences of neural activity
- Systems neuroscience – description of sensory and motors systems
- Developmental neuroscience – structural and functional changes during maturation
- Cognitive neuroscience – channels and stages of sensory processing, including memory
- Mathematical neuroscience – quantitative simulation and emulation of neuronal and brain function
- Clinical observations – evidence that can be gleaned from brain dysfunction

This diversity is inevitable, yet has arguably created a void: neglect of the primary role of the nervous system in enabling the animal to survive and prosper. Integrative neuroscience aims to fill this perceived void.

== Experimental methods ==
Identifying different brain regions through correlation and causal methods, combine to contribute an overall brain function and location map. Using different data collected from different methods combine to create a better interconnected and integrative understanding of the brain.

=== Correlation ===
The relationship between brain states and behavioral states. Observed through spatial and temporal differences. That pin point places in the brain affected by an action or stimuli, and the timing of the response. Tools used for this include fMRI and EEG, more information below.

==== Functional magnetic resonance imaging ====
Functional magnetic resonance imaging (fMRI) measures blood oxygen dependent response (BOLD), using magnetic resonance to observe blood oxygenated areas. Active areas are associated with increased blood flow, presenting a correlation relationship. The spatial localization of fMRI allows accurate information down to the nuclei and Brodmann areas. Certain activities such as the visual system are so rapid lasting only fractions of seconds, while other brain functions can take days or months such as memory. fMRI measures in the frame of seconds, making it difficult to measure extremely fast processes.

==== Electroencephalography ====
Electroencephalography (EEG) allows you to see the electrical activity of the brain over time, can only measure presented stimuli responses, stimuli the experimenter presents. it uses electrode sensors places on the surface on the skull to measure synchronous neuron firing. It can not be certain activity is caused by stimuli only a correlation between a given function and brain area. EEG measures overall changes in wide regions, lacking specificity.

=== Causal ===
Brain activity is directly caused by stimulation of a specific region, as proven through experimentation.

==== TMS ====
TMS (Transcranial magnetic stimulation) uses a magnetic coil releasing a burst of magnetic field that activated activity in a specific brain area. It is useful in exciting a specific area in the cortex and recording the MEPs (Motor Evoked Potentials) that occurs as a result. It gives certain causal relationships, but is limited to the cortex making it impossible to reach any deeper than the surface of the brain.

==== Lesions studies ====
When patients have natural lesions, it is an opportunity to watch how a lesion in a given region affects functionality. Or in non-human experimentation, lesions can be created by removing sections of the brain. These methods are not reversible, unlike brain studying techniques, and does not accurately show what that section of the brain are disabled due to the disruption of homeostasis in the brain. With a permeate lesion, the brain chemically adjusted and restores homeostasis Relying on natural occurrences has little control over variables such as location and size. And in cases with damage in multiple areas, differentiation is not certain with lack of mass data.

==== Electrode stimulation ====
Cortical Stimulation Mapping, invasive brain surgery that probes at area of the cortex to relate different regions to function. Typically occurs during open brain surgery where electrodes are inserted in areas and observations are made. This method is limited by number of patients having open brain surgery that consent to such experimentation, and to what area of the brain is being operated on. Also performed in mice with full range over the brain.

== Applications ==
=== Human Brain Project ===
Since the 'decade of the brain' there has been an explosion of insights into the brain and their application in most areas of medicine. With this explosion, the need for integration of data across studies, modalities and levels of understanding is increasingly recognized. A concrete exemplar of the value of large-scale data sharing has been provided by the Human Brain Project.

=== Medical ===
The importance of large-scale integration of brain information for new approaches to medicine has been recognized. Rather than relying mainly on symptom information, a combination of brain and gene information may ultimately be required for understanding what treatment is best suited to which individual person.

=== Behavioral ===
There is also work studying empathy and social behavior trends to better understand how empathy plays a role in behavioral science, and how the brain responds to empathy, produces empathy, and develops empathy over time. Combining these functional units and the social behavior and impact work to create a better understanding of the complex behaviors that create the human experience.
