= Henri Pezerat =

French chemistry researcher (b. 1928, d. 2009)

Henri Pézerat (April 12, 1928 - February 16, 2009) was a French research director, toxicologist and whistleblower.

== Early life ==
Henri was a graduate of the School of Chemistry of Lyon. While working in his Jussieu Campus chemistry laboratory, in 1973 Henri identified asbestos in the white dust falling from the ceiling. After examining the literature on this silicate and discovering its carcinogenic character, he reported this to an inter-union collective on safety.

== Career ==
In 1978, he supported the workers at the Amisol factory in Clermont-Ferrand.

Henri's later activism with the Anti-Asbestos Committee Jussieu and Ban Asbestos France led France to ban asbestos in 1997.

After his retirement, Henri continued to raise awareness around carcinogenic pollutants.

In 1999, he launched the Vincennes Pediatric Cancers Case, alerting the Director General of Health with a letter describing a spatiotemporal aggregate (cluster) of childhood cancers at the Franklin Roosevelt kindergarten, built on the old industrial wasteland left by Kodak factories. Supporting the parents of the Collectif Vigilance-Franklin, he represented victims on the scientific committee before resigning over a disagreement.

In 2000, he warned against the toxicity of heavy fuel escaping from the ship MV Erika.

His later fights involved asbestos removal on the aircraft carrier Clemenceau and the determination of the role of aluminum in the genesis of Alzheimer's disease.
