= Millstone Nuclear Power Plant =

Nuclear power plant located in Waterford, Connecticut

Millstone Power Station
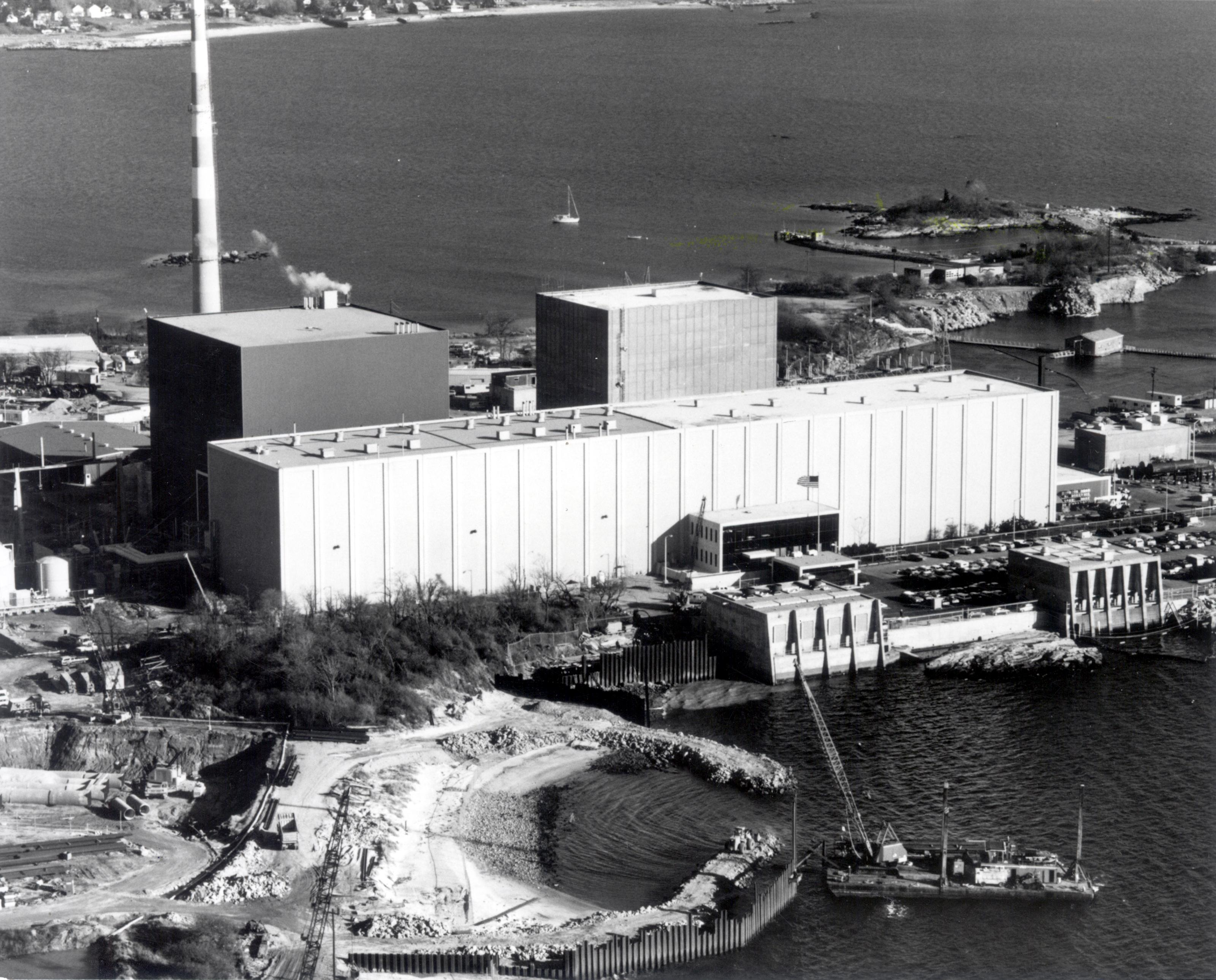
- Country: United States
- Location: Waterford, New London County, Connecticut
- Coordinates: 41°18′37.9614″N 72°10′3.7194″W
- Status: Operational
- Construction began: Unit 1: May 1, 1966; Unit 2: November 1, 1969; Unit 3: August 9, 1974
- Commission date: Unit 1: March 1, 1971; Unit 2: December 26, 1975; Unit 3: April 23, 1986
- Decommission date: Unit 1: July 1, 1998
- Construction cost: $8.845 billion (2007 USD, Units 2–3 only)
- Owner: Dominion Energy
- Operator: Dominion Energy

Nuclear power station
- Reactor type: Unit 1: BWR; Units 2–3: PWR
- Reactor supplier: Unit 1: General Electric; Unit 2: Combustion Engineering; Unit 3: Westinghouse
- Cooling source: Long Island Sound
- Thermal capacity: 1 × 2011 MW_{th} (decommissioned); 1 × 2700 MW_{th} 1 × 3709 MW_{th}

Power generation
- Units operational: 1 × 869 MW; 1 × 1243 MW
- Make and model: Unit 1: BWR-3 (Mark 1); Unit 2: CE 2-loop (DRYAMB); Unit 3: WH 4-loop (DRYSUB)
- Units decommissioned: 1 × 641 MW
- Nameplate capacity: 2112 MW
- Capacity factor: 89.99% (2017); 71.23% (lifetime)
- Annual net output: 17,216 GWh (2021)

External links
- Website: Millstone Power Station
- Commons: Related media on Commons

The Millstone Nuclear Power Station is the only nuclear power plant in Connecticut, United States, and the only multi-unit nuclear plant in New England. It is located at a former quarry (from which it takes its name) in Waterford. With a total capacity of over 2 GW, the station produces enough electricity to power about 2 million homes. The operation of the Millstone Power Station supports more than 3,900 jobs, and generates the equivalent of over half the electricity consumed in Connecticut.

The Millstone site covers about 500 acres (2 km^{2}). The power generation complex was built by a consortium of utilities, using Long Island Sound as a source of secondary side cooling. Millstone Units 2 and 3, both pressurized water reactors (one from Westinghouse and one from Combustion Engineering), were sold to Dominion Resources by Northeast Utilities in 2000 and continue to operate.

The plant has had numerous safety-related shutdowns and at times been placed on enhanced examination status by the Nuclear Regulatory Commission. In 1999, Northeast Utilities, the plant's operator at the time, agreed to pay $10 million in fines for 25 counts of lying to federal investigators and for having falsified environmental reports. Its subsidiary, Northeast Nuclear Energy Company, paid an additional $5 million for having made 19 false statements to federal regulators regarding the promotion of unqualified plant operators between 1992 and 1996.

On November 28, 2005, after a 22-month application and evaluation process, Millstone was granted a 20-year license extension for both units 2 and 3 by the NRC.

== Licensing history and milestones ==
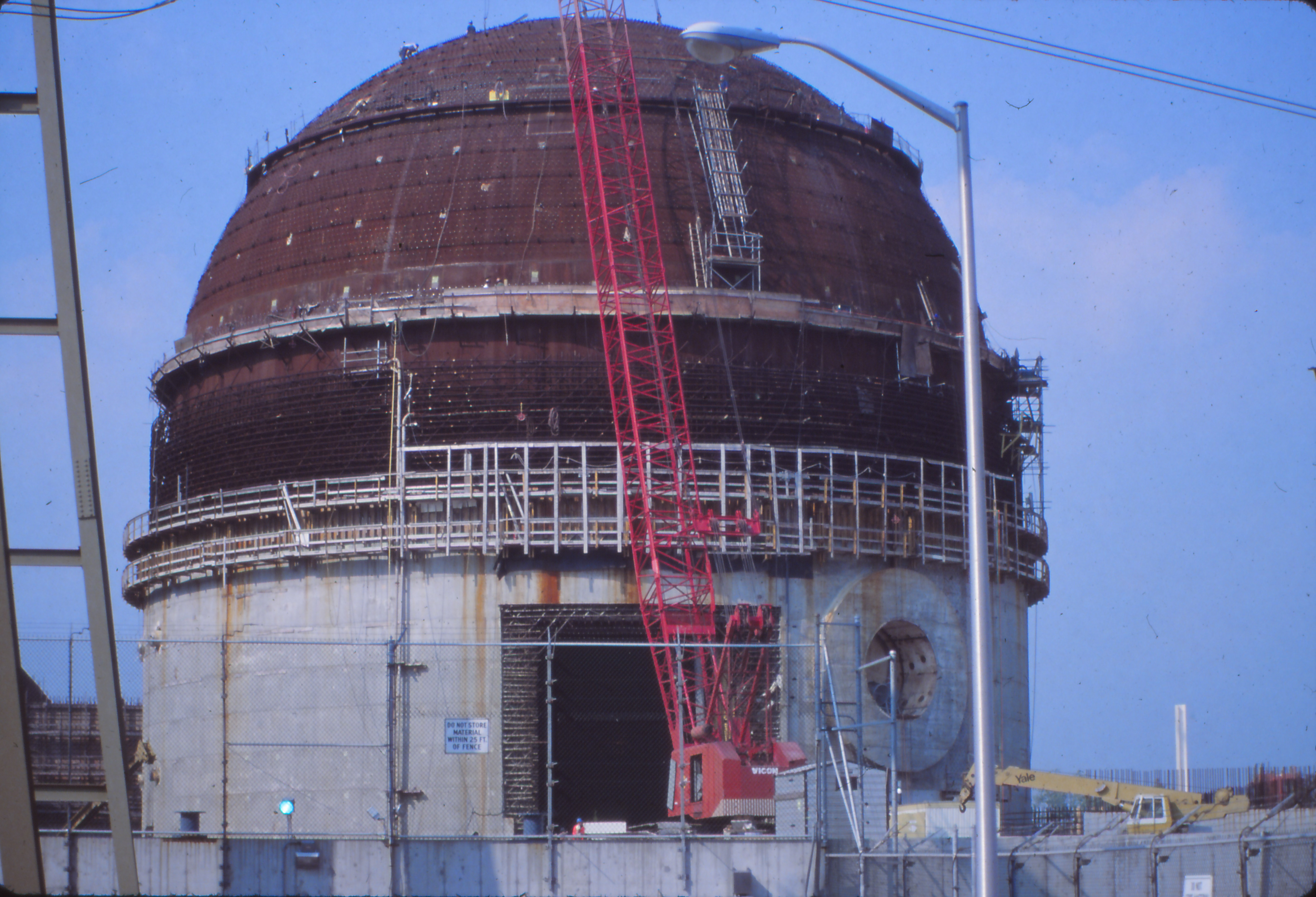
Work being performed on the containment structure at the Millstone Nuclear Power Plant.

=== Unit 1 ===
Millstone 1 was a General Electric boiling water reactor, producing 660 MWe, shut down in November 1995 before being permanently closed in July 1998.

- Construction permit issued: May 19, 1966
- Final safety analysis report filed: November 1, 1968
- Provisional operating license issued: October 7, 1970
- Full term operating license issued: October 31, 1986
- Full power license: October 7, 1970
- Initial criticality: October 26, 1970
- Synchronized to the grid: November 1970
- Commercial operation: December 28, 1970
- 100% power: January 6, 1971
- The U.S. Nuclear Regulatory Commission began a safety investigation relating to refueling procedures, based on information provided by George Galatis, a senior nuclear engineer, 1995.
- Leaking valve forced shutdown multiple equipment failures detected: February 20, 1996
- Permanently ceased operations: July 21, 1998

=== Unit 2 ===
Millstone 2 is a Combustion Engineering pressurized water reactor plant built in the 1970s, and has a maximum power output of 2700 thermal megawatts, or MWth (870 MWe). It has 2 steam generators, and 4 reactor cooling pumps. It is undergoing an upgrade to its safe shutdown system which already met NRC standards. During its refueling outage in October 2006, the operator installed a new pressurizer.

- Construction permit issued: December 11, 1970
- Final safety analysis report filed: August 15, 1972
- Full term operating licensing issued: September 26, 1975
- Full power license: September 26, 1975
- Initial criticality: January 17, 1975
- Commercial operation: December 26, 1975
- 100% power: March 20, 1976
- "Stretch power": June 25, 1979
- Operating license extension requested: December 22, 1986
- Operating license extension issued: January 12, 1988
- Full term operating license expires: December 11, 2010
- Operating license expires: July 31, 2015
- Extended operating license expires: July 31, 2035

=== Unit 3 ===
Millstone 3 is a Westinghouse plant that started operating in 1986, and has a maximum power output of 3650 MWth (1260 MWe). In the summer of 2008, the NRC approved a power uprate for Unit 3 that increased its electrical output 7.006% to 3709 MWth (1290 MWe). The increase took effect by the end of 2008.

- Construction permit issued: August 9, 1974
- Initial criticality: January 23, 1986
- Commercial operation: April 23, 1986
- Operating license expires: November 25, 2025
- Extended operating license expires: November 25, 2045

== Electricity Production ==
Generation (MWh) of Millstone Power Station
| Year | Jan | Feb | Mar | Apr | May | Jun | Jul | Aug | Sep | Oct | Nov | Dec | Annual (Total) |
|---|---|---|---|---|---|---|---|---|---|---|---|---|---|
| 2001 | 1,366,126 | 620,610 | 643,005 | 1,368,619 | 1,342,326 | 1,441,469 | 1,464,628 | 1,396,871 | 1,435,437 | 1,491,469 | 1,372,527 | 1,484,680 | 15,427,767 |
| 2002 | 1,477,462 | 1,020,136 | 850,042 | 1,159,749 | 1,497,037 | 1,421,445 | 1,484,163 | 1,292,391 | 750,180 | 1,251,934 | 1,453,640 | 1,260,093 | 14,918,272 |
| 2003 | 1,447,607 | 1,364,927 | 1,087,699 | 1,458,326 | 1,509,611 | 1,419,320 | 1,496,738 | 1,485,570 | 1,442,531 | 1,052,843 | 823,382 | 1,489,541 | 16,078,095 |
| 2004 | 1,514,725 | 1,416,949 | 1,357,314 | 669,780 | 1,198,434 | 1,466,127 | 1,500,558 | 1,494,418 | 1,455,788 | 1,514,313 | 1,435,926 | 1,514,765 | 16,539,097 |
| 2005 | 1,517,951 | 1,371,151 | 1,512,889 | 615,298 | 1,098,080 | 1,464,341 | 1,506,553 | 1,497,980 | 1,406,057 | 719,636 | 1,459,379 | 1,392,807 | 15,562,122 |
| 2006 | 1,519,136 | 1,308,343 | 1,518,458 | 1,280,682 | 1,516,725 | 1,463,454 | 1,502,444 | 1,498,380 | 1,453,911 | 959,234 | 1,055,264 | 1,513,415 | 16,589,446 |
| 2007 | 1,413,243 | 1,365,236 | 1,510,387 | 790,130 | 959,038 | 1,454,548 | 1,498,812 | 1,493,112 | 1,446,523 | 1,497,311 | 1,456,391 | 1,501,411 | 16,386,142 |
| 2008 | 1,506,855 | 1,407,918 | 1,503,666 | 923,531 | 1,032,094 | 1,394,073 | 1,463,357 | 1,484,185 | 1,440,365 | 940,798 | 771,358 | 1,564,746 | 15,432,946 |
| 2009 | 1,568,502 | 1,416,776 | 1,560,557 | 1,518,510 | 1,566,800 | 1,512,957 | 1,086,929 | 1,546,944 | 1,502,156 | 1,034,216 | 1,130,862 | 1,212,173 | 16,657,382 |
| 2010 | 1,403,129 | 1,368,339 | 1,560,238 | 918,593 | 947,990 | 1,518,345 | 1,561,523 | 1,446,144 | 1,506,738 | 1,565,484 | 1,425,006 | 1,528,775 | 16,750,304 |
| 2011 | 1,573,286 | 1,417,144 | 1,571,839 | 927,458 | 1,501,912 | 1,438,058 | 1,555,841 | 1,499,191 | 1,189,238 | 858,702 | 823,268 | 1,571,900 | 15,927,837 |
| 2012 | 1,557,888 | 1,455,944 | 1,570,928 | 1,518,162 | 1,546,933 | 1,512,620 | 1,528,126 | 1,287,047 | 1,491,488 | 1,015,837 | 1,024,275 | 1,568,639 | 17,077,887 |
| 2013 | 1,570,408 | 1,418,239 | 1,568,407 | 1,006,680 | 998,334 | 1,513,501 | 1,554,382 | 1,396,122 | 1,500,677 | 1,552,489 | 1,434,929 | 1,565,414 | 17,079,582 |
| 2014 | 1,547,921 | 1,370,137 | 1,564,866 | 984,611 | 915,374 | 1,433,769 | 1,456,260 | 1,545,219 | 1,492,737 | 957,780 | 1,003,232 | 1,568,713 | 15,840,619 |
| 2015 | 1,569,302 | 1,416,474 | 1,566,390 | 1,386,998 | 1,564,086 | 1,511,809 | 1,555,196 | 1,548,421 | 1,494,525 | 963,025 | 1,278,219 | 1,556,472 | 17,410,917 |
| 2016 | 1,395,804 | 1,453,731 | 1,553,691 | 870,970 | 1,042,398 | 1,157,289 | 1,545,157 | 1,465,939 | 1,492,559 | 1,541,912 | 1,502,398 | 1,553,644 | 16,575,492 |
| 2017 | 1,552,802 | 1,405,299 | 1,549,445 | 888,022 | 1,440,352 | 1,499,861 | 1,540,401 | 1,532,203 | 1,488,432 | 974,762 | 1,069,696 | 1,558,346 | 16,499,621 |
| 2018 | 1,562,198 | 1,408,160 | 1,557,604 | 1,503,520 | 1,550,957 | 1,500,266 | 1,538,028 | 1,528,480 | 1,397,258 | 907,772 | 887,693 | 1,539,556 | 16,881,492 |
| 2019 | 1,556,867 | 1,406,987 | 1,549,156 | 755,800 | 1,035,404 | 1,502,805 | 1,537,561 | 1,535,968 | 1,486,081 | 1,540,270 | 1,500,314 | 1,326,185 | 16,733,398 |
| 2020 | 1,555,862 | 1,460,856 | 1,559,892 | 985,158 | 912,169 | 1,380,637 | 1,544,050 | 1,511,859 | 1,492,689 | 664,016 | 1,135,412 | 1,512,255 | 15,714,855 |
| 2021 | 1,399,646 | 1,413,362 | 1,565,742 | 1,513,226 | 1,561,563 | 1,261,548 | 1,547,127 | 1,527,962 | 1,488,664 | 1,036,856 | 1,341,626 | 1,559,187 | 17,216,509 |
| 2022 | 1,423,440 | 1,408,875 | 1,556,974 | 802,500 | 644,649 | 1,385,138 | 1,551,414 | 1,546,783 | 1,494,689 | 1,557,614 | 1,519,821 | 1,572,270 | 16,464,167 |
| 2023 | 1,526,170 | 1,360,879 | 1,556,546 | 999,245 | 868,981 | 26,108 | 1,443,004 | 1,542,360 | 1,311,751 | 1,159,993 | 624,914 | 1,249,507 | 13,669,458 |
| 2024 | 1,263,781 | 1,466,547 | 1,568,155 | 1,517,438 | 1,557,143 | 1,508,201 | 1,548,361 | 1,514,012 | 1,070,529 | 972,997 | 1,321,169 | 1,561.972 | 16,870,305 |
| 2025 | 1,571,220 | 1,419,146 | 1,568,612 | 903,225 | 1,001,034 | 1,512,989 | 1,550,247 | 1,397,998 | 1,488,023 | 1,213,930 | 1,509,367 | 1,572,926 | 16,708,717 |
| 2026 | 1,573,882 | 1,420,114 | | | | | | | | | | | 2,993,996 (YTD) |

== Safety and environmental events ==
In December 1977, two hydrogen explosions occurred at the plant. The second explosion injured one man, who required hospitalization.

In October 1990, operator error during a routine test caused a shutdown of unit 2.

In September 1991, twenty reactor operators failed required licensing examinations. The shortfall of licensed operators necessitated a shutdown of unit 1 until March 1992.

In 1995 the U.S. Nuclear Regulatory Commission began a safety investigation relating to refueling procedures at Millstone unit 1, based on information provided by George Galatis, a senior nuclear engineer.

On February 26, 1996, a leaking valve forced the shutdown of units 1 and 2. Multiple equipment failures were found. Time magazine featured the plant on its cover, calling its operator a "rogue utility", and the Nuclear Regulatory Commission singled out Millstone for additional attention. Also in 1996, the plant released one gallon per hour of hydrazine into Long Island Sound. The plant's operators were convicted in 1999 for falsifying environmental records related to the hydrazine release.

Following the Time article and the subsequent shutdown of all reactors, unit 2 restarted May 11, 1999 and unit 3 restarted July 1, 1998. Unit 1 was never restarted as the cost of remedying numerous safety issues was too high.

In 2002 Millstone's operators were fined $288,000 for failing to have properly accounted for two uranium fuel rod components that had been misplaced 30 years earlier in 1972.

On April 17, 2005, Millstone unit 3 safely shut down without incident when a circuit board monitoring a steam pressure line short-circuited, which caused the board to malfunction and indicate an unsafe drop in pressure in the reactor's steam system, when in reality there was no drop in steam pressure. The cause was attributed to tin whiskers on the board. In response to this event, Millstone implemented a procedure to inspect for these whiskers at every refueling outage, or 18 months.

In September, 2009, unit 2 shut down when an electrical storm caused power fluctuations. When workers tried to restart the unit, they discovered a small leak in the reactor coolant pump. On December 21, 2009 the Unit 3 reactor tripped and shut down for longer than 72 hours. On July 27, 2009, the Unit 2 reactor tripped and shut down for longer than 72 hours. On August 9, 2013, the Unit 3 reactor tripped and shut down due to a malfunction. In 2016, unit 3 was shut down following a hydrogen gas leak.

== Surrounding population ==
The Nuclear Regulatory Commission defines two emergency planning zones around nuclear power plants: a plume exposure pathway zone with a radius of 10 miles (16 km), concerned primarily with exposure to, and inhalation of, airborne radioactive contamination, and an ingestion pathway zone of about 50 miles (80 km), concerned primarily with ingestion of food and liquid contaminated by radioactivity.

The 2010 U.S. population within 10 miles (16 km) of Millstone was 123,482, an increase of 29.5 percent in a decade, according to an analysis of U.S. Census data for msnbc.com. The 2010 U.S. population within 50 miles (80 km) was 2,996,756, an increase of 9.5 percent since 2000. Cities within 50 miles include Hartford (41 miles to city center), New Haven (43 miles to city center) and Cranston RI (47 miles).

== Seismic risk ==
The Nuclear Regulatory Commission's estimate of the risk each year of an earthquake intense enough to cause core damage to the reactor at Millstone was 1 in 90,909 for Reactor 2 and 1 in 66,667 for Reactor 3, according to an NRC study published in August 2010.

== See also ==
- List of largest power stations in the United States
- Lelan Sillin, Jr.
