= George Galatis =

American nuclear engineer and whistleblower

George Galatis is a senior nuclear engineer and whistleblower who reported safety problems at the Millstone 1 Nuclear Power Plant, relating to reactor refueling procedures, in 1996. The unsafe procedures meant that spent fuel rod pools at Unit 1 had the potential to boil, possibly releasing radioactive steam throughout the plant. Galatis was the subject of a Time magazine cover story on March 4, 1996. Millstone 1 was permanently closed in July 1998.

== Refueling procedures ==
Every 18 months the Millstone 1 nuclear reactor was shut down so the fuel rods that make up its core could be replaced; the old rods, radioactive and burning hot, were moved into a 40-feet-deep body of water called the spent-fuel pool. One-third of the rods were moved into the pool under normal conditions. But in the 1990s Galatis realized that Millstone was routinely performing "full-core off-loads", moving all the hot fuel into the spent-fuel pool. In addition, the Millstone 1 routine ignored the mandated 250-hour cool-down period before a full core off-load, and sometimes the fuel was moved just 65 hours after shutdown, a violation that melted the boots of one worker. By sidestepping the safety requirements in this way, Millstone saved about two weeks of downtime for each reactor refueling—during which Northeast Utilities had to pay $500,000 a day for replacement power.

Galatis eventually took his concerns to the Nuclear Regulatory Commission, to find that they had "known about the unsafe procedures for years". As a result of going to the NRC, Galatis experienced "subtle forms of harassment, retaliation, and intimidation".

== NRC investigation ==
The NRC Office of Inspector General investigated this episode and essentially agreed with Galatis in Case Number 95-771, the report of which tells the whole story:

The Office of Inspector General (OIG), U.S. Nuclear Regulatory Commission (NRC), initiated this investigation based on information submitted to the NRC pursuant to a 10 Code of Federal Regulations (CFR) 2.206 petition filed on August 21, 1995, on behalf of George Galatis, a senior engineer with Northeast Utilities Services Company (NU), and We the People, Inc. The petition alleged that the NRC knowingly allowed NU to operate the Millstone Unit 1 Nuclear Power Station for 20 years in violation of its operating license and beyond its design basis. The petitioners maintained that during normal refueling outages at Millstone Unit 1, NU offloaded the entire fuel core.

The OIG investigation developed evidence that NU operated Millstone Unit 1 outside of its design basis. The OIG investigation determined that the licensee may have violated the operating license for Millstone Unit 1 because of a failure to operate in accordance with its technical specification. One procedure required by the technical specifications is for the operation of the spent fuel cooling system. OIG uncovered information which indicates that for approximately 10 years, in order to handle the heat load from a full core offload, reactor operators at Millstone Unit 1 operated the spent fuel pool cooling system in a configuration that was not covered by a plant operating procedure.

== See also ==
- List of nuclear whistleblowers
- Nuclear accidents
- Nuclear accidents in the United States
- Nuclear safety
- Nuclear safety in the United States
- Nuclear whistleblowers
- Richard Levernier
