= List of FBI whistleblowers =

There have been numerous Federal Bureau of Investigation (FBI) whistleblowers who have spoken out about misconduct and wrongdoing in the FBI. Below is a list of whistleblowers who have come forward and made public whistleblower disclosures about the FBI.

== List ==
Name	Year	Action	Additional Links
Mark Felt	1972	W. Mark Felt was a senior FBI official and was widely known to the world as "Deep Throat" during the Watergate scandal of the Nixon administration. He communicated with Washington Post reporters Bob Woodward and Carl Bernstein after the 1972 break-in to the Democratic National Committee. At the time of the break-in, Felt was the second-most senior official at the FBI and put in charge of investigating the incident. Felt knew that Nixon had been involved in the 1972 break-in at the Democratic National Committee at the Watergate complex and Nixon's subsequent cover-up of the plot. In the aftermath of the scandal and during the election campaign of 1972, Felt supplied Woodward and Bernstein with information about the scandal, and the reporters managed to keep Felt's identity a secret. He only revealed his role as Deep Throat in 2005 through a Vanity Fair article.	Main article: Mark Felt
Frederic Whitehurst	1997	Frederic Whitehurst worked as a chemist at the FBI crime laboratories. In 1993, Whitehurst was sent to investigate the 1993 attempted bombing of the World Trade Center. Whitehurst blew the whistle when he realized that FBI officials were trying to manipulate evidence in the forensic labs in attempts to convict the suspects. He was removed from his position in the laboratory in 1997. In the same year as his removal, the Department of Justice Office of the Inspector General conducted an investigation into several FBI cases as a result of Whitehurst's allegations. In 1998, Whitehurst was awarded $1.16 million for the settlement of his whistleblower lawsuit against the FBI.	Main article: Frederic Whitehurst
William Tobin	1997	William Tobin worked in the FBI crime laboratory as a high-level forensic metallurgist and was assigned to work on the TWA Flight 800 crash, which occurred in July 1997. In 1999, Tobin testified in front of the U.S. Senate Committee on the Judiciary Subcommittee on Oversight and the Courts, raising concerns about the criminal portion of the case. In the testimony, he questioned the FBI officials' theories that a bomb was the cause of the crash. After retiring from the FBI in 1998, Tobin published research about how the science of the FBI's analysis of bullets and their composition was flawed.	
Jane Turner (FBI whistleblower)	1999-2007	Jane Turner joined the FBI in 1978 and was one of around 100 women who were employed by the bureau at the time. Turner was stationed in Minot, North Dakota for 12 years, working to protect child sex crime victims on a reservation. Turner blew the whistle after observing how FBI was mishandling cases of child sex crimes. In one brutal case, she discovered that the rape of a two-year-old Native American child had been classified by the FBI as a motor vehicle accident. In 1998-1999 she filed a discrimination and retaliation lawsuit against the FBI and won the jury trial in 2007. Turner also made a whistleblower disclosure regarding her coworkers' alleged stealing of items from Ground Zero after the September 11, 2001 terror attacks. She filed a second whistleblower retaliation case after she was placed on administrative leave and the FBI recommended that she be removed in 2003. Turner won this second retaliation case but resigned from the FBI in 2003.	Main article: Jane Turner (FBI whistleblower)
Sibel Edmonds	2002	Sibel Edmonds worked as a language specialist for the FBI. After the September 11, 2001 terrorist attacks, Edmonds made whistleblower disclosures about misconduct and security breaches. Her allegations led to an investigation by the U.S. Department of Justice Office of Inspector General, which found that the FBI had not adequately investigated Edmonds' allegations about improper conduct committed by a coworker. The investigation also found that the FBI mishandled Edmonds' allegations and stated that her March 2002 firing was an act of whistleblower retaliation. In 2002, she filed a Freedom of Information Act lawsuit to find out more about the FBI's actions. However, the lawsuit was stymied by the Attorney General at the time when he invoked state secrets privilege, which deemed her entire case a matter of state secrets.	Main article: Sibel Edmonds
John Roberts	2002	John Roberts worked as the chief of the FBI's Internal Affairs and blew the whistle on alleged misconduct in the FBI. Robert's lawyers obtained permission for Roberts to go on CBS and make public disclosures about retaliation in the FBI. He was retaliated against shortly after his TV appearance. This case was mentioned in a 2003 U.S. Department of Justice Office of the Inspector General report.	
Coleen Rowley	2002	Coleen Rowley worked as an FBI agent in Minnesota and blew the whistle on the FBI's investigation of Zacarias Moussaoui, a terrorist linked to the September 11, 2001 attacks. Rowley wrote a memo to then-FBI director Robert Mueller about the mishandling of intel about Moussaoui that came from the Minneapolis office. When the memo was leaked, Rowley testified before the Senate Judiciary Committee in 2002 about issues she felt were plaguing the FBI. In her testimony, she described slow bureaucracy, convoluted job hierarchies that made decision-making difficult, and "roadblocks" in investigating terror threats. She was chosen alongside two other whistleblowers for TIME's Person of the Year.	Main article: Coleen Rowley
Michael German	2002	Michael German started working for the FBI in 1988 and blew the whistle in 2002 on an FBI informant's illegal conduct. German became a whistleblower when he reported the conduct of an FBI informant who had made illegal recordings between investigation subjects. He resigned from the FBI after being retaliated against.	Main article: Michael German
Bassem Youssef (FBI agent)	2003	Bassem Youssef headed the overseas office of the FBI and worked in the counterterrorism unit. He filed a discrimination lawsuit against the FBI after leaving the Bureau in 2003, alleging that he was discriminated against. He stated in his action that he was passed over for assignments that called for Arabic speakers, and that roles were being filled by people who were not as qualified. In 2008, Youssef testified to the House Judiciary Committee about other deficiencies in the FBI's counterterrorism work.	Main article: Bassem Youssef (FBI agent)
Robert Kobus	2005	Robert Kobus worked as an FBI Operations Manager and blew the whistle in 2005 when he discovered that some officials were creating false time records. He made disclosures to senior FBI staff, but was retaliated against as a result. Kobus then faced retaliation in the workplace, which included being moved to work in a near-empty office, and agency employees mishandling his requests for time off. The U.S. Department of Justice later found that the FBI had retaliated against him.	
Darin Jones	2012	Darin Jones worked as a Supervisory Contract Specialist at the FBI. In 2012, he made disclosures to his supervisors about what he viewed were improper procurement practices and was later fired. He appealed the decision of his termination to the U.S. Department of Justice Inspector General and the Merit Systems Protection Board, but his case was denied by the DOJ because he had made his whistleblower disclosures to his supervisors and not to a higher-level FBI agent, per the FBI policy at the time. In 2016 the National Whistleblower Center filed an amicus brief in support of Jones, but his case ended up not being heard by the Supreme Court.	

== See also ==
- List of FBI controversies
- List of whistleblowers
- Whistleblower protection in the United States
