= Whistleblower Week in Washington =

The Whistle blower Week is the name given to a series of events in Washington, D.C. meant to raise awareness about whistle blowing. There were two whistle blower weeks which took place in Washington in two different years.

The first Whistle blower Week took place in Washington, D.C. from May 13–19, 2007 and was sponsored by a loose coalition of whistle blower-related advocacy groups. The week was timed to coincide with the fifth anniversary of the May 15, 2002 enactment of the "Notification and Federal Employee Anti-discrimination and Retaliation Act of 2002" (Public Law 107-174), now known as the No-FEAR Act. During the week, whistle blowers and their allies gathered for awards ceremonies, speeches, panel discussions, and training sessions. The 2007 event was featured in the New York Times and announced in the Congressional Record by Republican Senator Charles Grassley of Iowa.

The second Whistle blower Week took place May 12–15, 2008 and was sponsored by the No Fear Coalition, the Semmelweis Society, and the Bill of Rights Foundation.

== 2007 Week events and participants ==
The first Whistle blower Week was organized by around fifty organizations and included a diverse group of participants, from a United States Senator to a 9–11 conspiracy theorist recruiting followers. Their main objective was to address issues about whistle blowing and more than forty public interests were addressed.

Notable attendees included:

- Senator Chuck Grassley, who received a lifetime achievement award from the National Whistleblower Center for his fight against waste, fraud and corruption in government.
- Jeffrey Wigand, a former tobacco executive who reported the industry's manipulation of nicotine levels in cigarettes and was featured in the movie The Insider.
- Coleen Rowley, who blew the whistle on the FBI's negligence preceding the September 11 terrorist attack. Ms. Rowley was named as one of Time Magazine's Persons of the Year, along with conference supporter and Enron whistleblower Sherron Watkins. The FBI Oversight Panel was led by former FBI Special Agents Rowley and Mike German.
- Janet Howard, Joyce E. Megginson and Tanya Ward Jordan, members of the No FEAR Coalition and class agents who blew the whistle on race discrimination at the Department of Commerce (Janet Howard, et al. vs Department of Commerce).
- Bogdan Dzakovic, former Federal Aviation Administration terrorism expert.
- Dr. Marsha Coleman-Adebayo, an EPA employee who won a racial and gender discrimination lawsuit after alleging that a United States company was exposing South African miners and their families to toxic levels of vanadium.
- Bunnatine H. Greenhouse, of the Army Corps of Engineers. Greenhouse opposed the process that awarded government contracts to Halliburton, Inc., without counterbids.
- Stephen M. Kohn, Co-founder and Executive Director of the National Whistleblower Center hosted a series of workshops to aid whistleblowers and their lawyers. Kohn reminded participants that they stand to gain monetarily from whistleblowing activities.

== 2008 participants ==
- Adam Kokesh
- Reverend Lennox Yearwood, Jr.
- Senator Charles Grassley
- Congresswoman Sheila Jackson Lee of Texas
- Congressman James Clyburn of South Carolina
