= National Whistleblower Appreciation Day =

- Also called: National Whistleblower Day
- Significance: Commemorating the actions of whistleblowers and their contributions to society.
- Date: 30 July
- Next time: 30 July 2026
- Frequency: annual

National Whistleblower Appreciation Day is an annual recognition of whistleblowers whose actions have protected the American people from fraud or malfeasance.

Each year since 2013, both the U.S. Senate and the U.S. House of Representatives have passed resolutions designating July 30 as National Whistleblower Appreciation Day.

The 2021 Senate and House resolutions designating July 30 as National Whistleblower Appreciation Day were passed in July, with senators Chuck Grassley (R-IA) and Ron Wyden (D-OR) leading the Senate resolution effort and Representatives Jackie Speier (D-CA), Carolyn Maloney (D-NY), and Kathleen Rice (D-NY) leading the passage of the House resolution.

== Background and History ==
July 30 has been chosen as National Whistleblower Appreciation Day because it commemorates the passage of the very first U.S. whistleblower law, which was passed on July 30, 1778.

The case centered around whistleblowers' complaints about Continental Navy commander Esek Hopkins, whom the whistleblowers alleged participated in torturing captured British sailors. Two of the ten whistleblowers, Samuel Shaw (naval officer) and Richard Marven, were jailed because Hopkins retaliated against them. Marven and Shaw sent a petition that was read to Congress on July 23 that claimed they had done nothing to warrant their arrests, and on July 30, Congress enacted the first whistleblower law.

National Whistleblower Day is commemorated each year with passages of resolutions in the House and Senate, but has not been permanently designated as a holiday yet.

== National Whistleblower Day Celebrations ==
Every year on July 30 since 2015, the National Whistleblower Center has hosted a celebration in honor of National Whistleblower Day. The National Whistleblower Day 2021 was held virtually, and nearly 10,000 people were in attendance for the event, which spanned three days.

Other National Whistleblower Days have been held on Capitol Hill in Washington, DC. Past high-profile guest speakers at National Whistleblower Day celebrations include a host of government officials like Senator Chuck Grassley, Senator Ron Wyden, and Michael E. Horowitz, as well as whistleblowers like Enron whistleblower Sherron Watkins, Linda Tripp, Jane Turner (FBI whistleblower), and FBI crime laboratory whistleblower Frederic Whitehurst.

== Actions of Senate Resolutions ==
Year	Date	Action
2013	2013-07-30	Introduced in Senate
2013	2013-07-30	Passed/agreed to in Senate: Submitted in the Senate, considered, and agreed to without amendment and with a preamble by Unanimous Consent.
2014	2014-07-28	Introduced in Senate
2014	2014-07-28	Passed/agreed to in Senate: Submitted in the Senate, considered, and agreed to without amendment and with a preamble by Unanimous Consent
2015	2015-07-30	Introduced in Senate
2015	2015-07-30	Passed/agreed to in Senate: Submitted in the Senate, considered, and agreed to without amendment and with a preamble by Unanimous Consent.
2016	2016-07-07	Introduced in Senate
2016	2016-07-07	Passed/agreed to in Senate: Submitted in the Senate, considered, and agreed to without amendment and with a preamble by Unanimous Consent.
2017	2017-07-25	Introduced in Senate
2017	2017-08-01	Senate Committee on the Judiciary discharged by Unanimous Consent.
2017	2017-08-01	Passed/agreed to in Senate: Resolution agreed to in Senate without amendment and with a preamble by Unanimous Consent.
2018	2018-06-28	Introduced in Senate
2018	2018-07-12	Senate Committee on the Judiciary discharged by Unanimous Consent.
2018	2018-07-12	Passed/agreed to in Senate: Resolution agreed to in Senate without amendment and with a preamble by Unanimous Consent.
2019	2019-05-08	Introduced in Senate
2019	2019-07-23	Senate Committee on the Judiciary discharged by Unanimous Consent.
2019	2019-07-23	Passed/agreed to in Senate: Resolution agreed to in Senate without amendment and with a preamble by Unanimous Consent.
2020	2020-06-22	Introduced in Senate
2020	2020-07-01	Senate Committee on the Judiciary discharged by Unanimous Consent.
2020	2020-07-01	Passed/agreed to in Senate: Resolution agreed to in Senate without amendment and with a preamble by Unanimous Consent.
2021	2021-07-27	Introduced in Senate
2021	2021-07-27	Passed/agreed to in Senate: Submitted in the Senate, considered, and agreed to without amendment and with a preamble by Unanimous Consent.
2022	2022-07-30	Introduced in Senate
2022	7-30	Passed/agreed to in Senate: Submitted in the Senate, considered, and agreed to without amendment and with a preamble by Unanimous Consent.
2023	2023-07-13	Introduced in Senate
2023	2023-07-13	Submitted in the Senate, considered, and agreed to without amendment and with a preamble by Unanimous Consent

== Actions of House Resolutions ==
Year	Date	Action
2018	2018-06-28	Introduced in House
2018	2018-06-28	Referred to the House Committee on Oversight and Reform.
2019	2019-03-14	Introduced in House
2019	2019-03-14	Referred to the House Committee on Oversight and Reform.
2021	2021-07-30	Introduced in House
