= Michael D. Kohn =

American lawyer

- Born: December 28, 1954 (age 71); Plainfield, New Jersey, U.S.
- Education: Rutgers University (BS); Antioch School of Law (JD)
- Occupation: Lawyer

Michael D. Kohn (born December 28, 1954, in Plainfield, New Jersey) is a founding partner of the Washington, D.C., law firm Kohn, Kohn & Colapinto, where he specializes in whistleblower protection law.

== Biography ==
A graduate of Rutgers University (B.S. in biology), he received his Juris Doctor degree from the Antioch School of Law. After graduating from Antioch, he served as Director of Legal Ethics for the Government Accountability Project. Kohn co-founded the law firm now known as Kohn, Kohn & Colapinto with his brother Stephen in 1988.

The original focus of the law firm was defending nuclear power industry whistleblowers, although the firm serves whistleblowers in other areas. KKC's most notable client was Linda Tripp.

Kohn is president and general counsel for the National Whistleblower Center and is an attorney-trustee for the National Whistleblower Legal Defense and Education Fund.

== Publications ==
- Kohn, Stephen M; Kohn, Michael D; Colapinto, David K (2004). Whistleblower Law: A Guide to Legal Protections for Corporate Employees. Praeger. OCLC 939102743.
- Kohn, Stephen M; Kohn, Michael D (1988). The labor lawyer's guide to the rights and responsibilities of employee whistleblowers. Quorum Books. ISBN 978-0-89930-207-2. OCLC 246530581.
