= Kohn, Kohn & Colapinto =

American law firm in Washington, D.C.

Kohn, Kohn & Colapinto LLP
- Headquarters: Washington, D.C.
- No. of offices: 1
- Offices: Dupont Circle
- No. of attorneys: 8
- Major practice areas: Whistleblower Rewards, Whistleblower Retaliation
- Key people: Stephen M. Kohn, Michael D. Kohn, David K. Colapinto, Allison Lee
- Date founded: 1988
- Founder: Stephen M. Kohn
- Company type: Limited Liability Partnership
- Website: www.kkc.com

Kohn, Kohn & Colapinto is a Washington, D.C., United States, based international whistleblower rights law firm specializing in anti-corruption and whistleblower law, representing whistleblowers who seek rewards, or who are facing employer retaliation, for reporting violations of the False Claims Act, Foreign Corrupt Practices Act, Dodd-Frank Wall Street Reform, Sarbanes-Oxley Acts, Commodity and Security Exchange Acts and the IRS Whistleblower law.

The firm's most notable client is Bradley Birkenfeld, a private banker who blew the whistle on UBS AG's aiding and abetting of tax fraud by the Swiss bank's American clientele. Other notable clients include Danske Bank whistleblower Howard Wilkinson, who exposed what many experts believe to be the largest money laundering scandal in world banking history, and Linda Tripp, the former White House and U.S. Department of Defense employee who blew the whistle on President Bill Clinton's affair with Monica Lewinsky.

== Current operations ==
Kohn, Kohn & Colapinto specializes in a variety of anti-corruption and whistleblower law practice areas, including tax evasion, securities and commodities fraud, qui tam, environmental crimes, animal trafficking, and white-collar crime. The firm has also worked on behalf of whistleblowers who have suffered workplace retaliation for reporting fraud internally.

Working with the National Whistleblower Center, Kohn, Kohn and Colapinto is active on a range of pro bono works. KKC has provided pro bono representation to public interest organizations and whistleblowers at congressional policy and legislative hearings. The firm has submitted numerous amicus curiae briefs in landmark whistleblowing cases before the Supreme Court to establish legal precedents on whistleblower protection laws.

KKC has also served the public interest by filing various reports and petitions to contribute to the Securities and Exchange Commission and Internal Revenue Service whistleblower rulemaking. They have worked toward strengthening whistleblower reward provisions in major environmental and wildlife protection laws by advocating the effectiveness of incentivizing whistleblowers worldwide in preventing environmental crimes.

== Legal history ==
=== Founding and establishment ===
Kohn, Kohn and Colapinto was founded in 1988 by Stephen Kohn, Michael Kohn, and David Colapinto. The three partners also founded the National Whistleblower Center in 1988.

=== Initial cases (1985–1989) ===
Before founding Kohn, Kohn & Colapinto, the future partners represented whistleblowers in complex civil litigation against major corporations, including Duke Power Company, Brown & Root, Inc. Texas Utilities, DuPont, B.F. Shaw Co., and Arizona Public Service.

==== Roger Wensil & Joy Adams (1985-87) and disqualifying unethical corporate law firm ====
Among their early victories was disqualifying the most prestigious corporate law firm representing nuclear utilities for unethical conduct, winning the first-ever successful whistleblower case at a nuclear weapons plant, including reinstatement orders for whistleblowers Roger Wensil and Joy Adams.

==== Douglas Plumley, Howard Samuel Nunn and Kansas Gas and Electric (1985-88) ====
Prior to founding Kohn, Kohn and Colapinto, Stephen Kohn served as the director of corporate litigation of the Government Accountability Project, and prevailed on a number of precedent-setting cases. Kohn represented whistleblower Douglas Plumley, who filed a lawsuit claiming chemical fumes from the furniture shop were injurious and in violation of the Clean Air Act. This was first-ever case finding a federal prisoner covered under a whistleblower law.

Kohn, Kohn & Colapinto also set a nationwide legal precedent in the case Howard Samuel Nunn, Jr., v. Duke Power Company.

Duke Power expanded the scope of protected activity under the nuclear whistleblower law to include raising safety concerns with non-profit advocacy groups. Kohn was also one of the principle authorities behind the amicus brief filed in the Kansas Gas and Electric case that set important precedent protecting quality assurance inspectors and internal whistleblowers from retaliation.

In 1985, future founder and partner of Kohn, Kohn & Colapinto Stephen M. Kohn wrote the first-ever legal treatise on whistleblower law, Protecting Environmental and Nuclear Whistleblowers: A Litigation Manual. James Florio, the former Congressman and Governor of New Jersey described the books as “an invaluable tool for environmental groups, unions and labor lawyers". - Congressional Record (Feb. 26, 1987).

==== The Village Voice (1988) ====
Stephen Kohn represented The Village Voice newspaper in a high-profile case regarding depositions conducted in the controversial Iran-Contra affair. Kohn successfully argued that The Voice has a right to sit in on pretrial depositions, over the objection of one of the Iran-Contra defendants. The U.S. District Court agreed and set national precedent on this issue. The case was widely reported in the New York Times, the ABA Journal and other publications, and remains the controlling precedent.

=== Early cases (1988–1990s) ===
==== Joseph J. Macktal, Harry Barko and hush money (1988) ====
The firm successfully litigated the first whistleblower hush money cases, which resulted in a nationwide ban on restrictive settlements in nuclear and environmental lawsuits. As a result, settlement agreements required government approval to ensure the rights of whistleblowers to report safety issues. The firm successfully litigated these hush money cases in the Fourth, Fifth, and Ninth Circuits.

Founded in July 1988, Kohn, Kohn & Colapinto's earliest case involved representing whistleblower Joseph J. Macktal, a journeyman electrician who was retaliated against and eventually terminated as a result of raising safety concerns at the KBR's Comanche Peak nuclear power plant.

In 1986, Macktal filed a whistleblower retaliation lawsuit against the prime contractor at the Comanche Peak nuclear power construction site. The agreement contained a restrictive non-disclosure agreement prohibiting Macktal from raising safety concerns with the Nuclear Regulatory Commission (NRC). Macktal strongly objected to the non-disclosure agreement, but was told by his then-attorneys that he no choice, and to sign away his rights in order to settle his employment case.

In 1988, Macktal terminated his prior lawyers and hired the law firm of Kohn, Kohn and Colapinto for the purpose of challenging the legality of his settlement agreement, which he termed as a “hush money” deal. Kohn, Kohn and Colapinto released Macktal's agreement to the public and asked the NRC and Department of Labor to find the agreement void against public policy. They also contacted the U.S. Senate Subcommittee on Nuclear Regulation requesting that they exercise their oversight responsibility to outlaw these types of agreements nationwide. This dispute lead to a nationwide debate and was followed by a series of proceedings in which Macktal systemically outlawed the practice.

The case included a successful appeal to the U.S. Court of Appeals for the Fifth Circuit, forcing the Nuclear Regulatory Commission to prohibit restrictive non-disclosure agreements nationwide. Ultimately decisions in the Labor Department found the settlement void, permitting Macktal to reinstate his labor case and keep the settlement money he was paid, while also continuing to sue KBR. The Macktal case was the first case outlawing restrictive non-disclosure under whistleblower laws.

Years later, Harry Barko exposed similar NDAs used by KBR to hide fraud in taxpayer spending in the War in Iraq. Barko took his case to the Securities and Exchange Commission and won the precedent outlawing all such agreements in the publicly traded economy. Together, Macktal and Barko set the legal precedent that today benefits all whistleblowers and changed the face of modern whistleblower law.

=== Nuclear and FBI whistleblowers (1990–2000s) ===
==== Vera English (1990) ====
Vera English was a lab technician at one of the nuclear facilities owned and operated by the General Electric Company. English was terminated from her position after exposing radioactive contamination in the facility. Her case went to the Supreme Court, English v. General Electric Company, and set a precedent allowing whistleblowers to seek cases under state law. Her win also displayed the application of whistleblower protection legislation in cases of whistleblowing in nuclear energy cases.

==== Linda Mitchell (1992) ====
Linda Mitchell was an engineer at the Palo Verde Nuclear Generating Station when she blew the whistle on the Arizona Public Service Company (APS) – the owner of the generating station.

In 1985, Mitchell reported a number of safety concerns she observed at Palo Verde to the Nuclear Regulatory Commission (NRC). Most notably, Mitchell brought concerns to management regarding a computer program the facility was using, as well as the layout of the plant. In 1989, Mitchell filed a complaint to the NRC, alleging that the Arizona Public Service Company had attempted to suppress an ongoing NRC investigation and the findings of safety issues at Palo Verde. Soon after her reporting, she was subjected to harassment personally and at the facility.

In 1992, Mitchell won a Department of Labor discrimination lawsuit, and in 1994, was granted permission to have a public hearing before the NRC's Atomic Safety and Licensing Board. She also requested three of the units at Palo Verde be reduced to zero percent power until a further safety review could be conducted.

==== Sarah Thomas (1993) ====
Sarah Thomas was a Radiation Waste Aide at the Palo Verde Nuclear Generating Station when she blew the whistle on the Arizona Public Service Company (APS) – the owner of the generation station. Soon after her reporting, she was subjected to harassment personally and at the facility. She filed a complaint with the Department of Labor concerning various safety violations, a failure to promote, and harassment on the job. APS was ordered to promote Thomas to a senior technician position, and also provide her with damages as a result of the discrimination.

==== William Marcus (1994) ====
William Marcus was a Senior Science Advisor to the Environmental Protection Agency, when he witnessed the Office of Drinking Water approve a policy that added fluoride to the nations drinking water. He was immediately fired for his report, which claimed that fluoride could increase cancer rates in the population.

Marcus' testimony led to the founding of various frauds committed by major chemical companies who tried to suppress his safety concerns. In front of an Administrative Law Judge, Marcus won his case and was instated with full back pay, as well as significant award damages for his suffering.

==== Allen Mosbaugh (1995) ====
Allen Mosbaugh worked as a superintendent of engineering liaison at the Vogtle Electric Generating Plant, owned by the Georgia Power Company. In 1989, Mosbaugh sent the Nuclear Regulatory Commission (NRC) a memo about a violation of technical specifications, in regards to specific valves at the plant.

In 1990, Mosbaugh joined Marvin Hobby in petition the NRC to perform a review of the Georgia Power Company, asking to impose civil penalties for dangerous operation of the facility. They also petitioned the NRC to petitioned for penalties for the illegal transfer of control to the Southern Nuclear Operating Company. In that same year, Mosbaugh was terminated from his position.

He immediately filed a complaint alleging that his termination was an act of retaliation under the Energy Reorganization Act of 1974. In 1992, two years of filing his complaint, The Administrative Law Judge on his case ruled that the Georgia Power Company had not acted in retaliation. However, in 1993, the NRC issued a report that supported Mosbaugh's claim, and in 1995, the Secretary of Labor concluded that he had in fact been retaliated against.

==== William Sanjour (1995) ====
William Sanjour worked in the Environmental Protection Agency's (EPA) hazardous waste division during the 1970s and was an employee for over 25 years. Throughout his career, Sanjour challenged numerous safety practices of the agency to ensure the EPA was properly dealing with hazardous waste.

In 1995, Sanjour won a lawsuit which set a nationwide precedent about the First Amendment right of federal employees to blow the whistle on their employers. In Sanjour v. EPA, Sanjour challenged numerous rules, which restricted EPA employees from speaking with environmental groups. This decisions is still in effect today.

In 2007, Sanjour was the recipient of the Association of Certified Fraud Examiners (ACFE) Sentinel Award, which recognizes those who "choose truth over self".

==== Shannon Doyle (1996) ====
Shannon Doyle worked at Alabama Power's J.M. Farley Nuclear Plant, when in 1989, he reported safety violations to the Nuclear Regulatory Commission (NRC). He filed his complaint against Hydro Nuclear Services under the Energy Reorganization Act of 1974, when the company decided not to hire him as a casual employee because he did not sign a release that allowed the company to perform a background check.

==== Frederic Whitehurst (1997) ====
Frederic Whitehurst is considered the first modern-day FBI whistleblower. In the 1990s, Whitehurst worked as a chemist for the Federal Bureau of Investigation (FBI) and was one of their top experts in explosive residues. During his career, Whitehurst reported a lack of scientific standards and serious flaws in the FBI Laboratory. This included the first World Trade Center bombing and Oklahoma City bombing.

Whitehurst's whistleblowing triggered a massive reexamination of the FBI Laboratory following a report by the US Department of Justice Inspector General in 1997. President Clinton ordered the Attorney General to implement the laws. In 1997, Whitehurst testified at the House Judiciary Subcommittee hearings on the FBI Laboratory and filed a federal lawsuit claiming whistleblower retaliation. He reached a settlement with the FBI worth $1.16 million.

Whitehurst now directs the FBI Oversight Project of the National Whistleblower Center.

==== Linda Tripp (1998) ====
Kohn, Kohn & Colapinto gained nationwide attention representing whistleblower Linda Tripp regarding her revelations of Monica Lewinsky's involvement in the sex scandal that brought about the impeachment of President Bill Clinton. The revelations that Lewinsky and Clinton had lied in their legal filings in the sexual harassment case brought against the sitting president by Paula Jones, and that Lewinsky had tried to suborn perjury from Tripp, who knew about her affair with Clinton, was one of the main factors influencing the articles of impeachment voted by the House of Representatives.

Kohn, Kohn & Colapinto handled Tripp's lawsuit against the Justice Department and the Department of Defense under the Privacy Act of 1974. Tripp had sued the government for violating her rights under the Privacy Act alleging that the Clinton Administration leaked confidential details of her employment record to the press. The government eventually settled with Tripp, including agreeing to a one-time payment of more than $595,000, a retroactive promotion, and retroactive pay at the highest salary for 1998, 1999 and 2000. She also received a pension and was cleared to work for the federal government again.

Tripp died of pancreatic cancer at the age of 70 on April 8, 2020.

=== Early 21st-century cases (2000–2010) ===
==== Paul Jayko (2000) ====
Paul Jayko was an Environmental Specialist for the Ohio Environmental Protection Agency. In 1997, Jayko was assigned as a site coordinator for River Valley Schools area, he discovered that school buildings were built on a site of a former military installation, where carcinogenic materials were buried and disposed. When he attempted to investigate the link between the site and the increased incidence of leukemia in the area, Jayko gradually lost his responsibilities and was ultimately terminated. Later, the manager behind the retaliation against Jayko lost his bid to become Director Enforcement for the U.S. Environmental Protection Agency in large part due to the finding by the judge in the Jayko case that the head of the Ohio's EPA personally retaliated against Mr. Jayko.

==== James J. Bobreski (2001) ====
James J. Bobreski was a contracted process control technician when he blew the whistle on the D.C. Water and Sewage Authority. While working at the Blue Plains Advanced Wastewater treatment plant, Bobreski raised concerns that the plant's safety alarms were functioning incorrectly and a chlorine gas leak had occurred at Blue Plains. He was soon terminated after notifying supervisors of faulty gas sensors, and in defense, Bobreski took his story to The Washington Post describing WASA's reprisal. In 2001, Bobreski filed a whistleblower protection complaint with the Department of Labor and won. It was ruled in 2015 that Bobreski's whistleblower protection had been violated.

==== Bassem Youssef (2001) ====
Bassem Youssef was a Unit Chief in the Federal Bureau of Investigation (FBI) Counterterrorism Division. Youssef blew the whistle on FBI hiring practices and sued the FBI for discrimination in 2003. In his lawsuit, he claimed that in the wake of the Sept. 11, 2001 attacks, he had been passed over for promotions to work in counterterrorism, even though he had relevant experience and was one of the only fluent Arabic speakers at his level at the FBI at the time. Instead, others with less relevant experience and skills were promoted to counterterrorism positions. Youssef spoke out against these practices, saying that he was retaliated against. He was assigned a desk job and stated that post-9/11, his skills as an Arabic speaker and polygraph examiner had not been used. In 2006, the Department of Justice's Office of Professional Responsibility ruled that the FBI had illegally retaliated against Youssef because of his whistleblowing.

==== Richard Convertino (2002) ====
Richard Covertino is a former federal prosecutor who obtained the first conviction of a defendant in a terrorism case post-9/11. Convertino testified before the U.S. Senate Finance Committee in September 2003 about the lack of support coming from the Bush Administration on anti-terrorism prosecutions after 9/11. Convertino alleged that the Justice Department leaked information and violated a court order to publicly smear him in retaliation for his whistleblowing. Convertino filed a lawsuit against the Department of Justice under the Privacy Act, in response to the retaliation he experienced. Additionally, the Justice Department indicted Convertino for obstruction of justice and lying, which Convertino alleges is further retaliation.

The Department of Justice later dropped their charges against Convertino.

==== Sibel Edmonds (2002) ====
Sibel Edmonds is a former FBI translator naturalized American citizen of Turkish descent who was terminated in 2002 by the FBI for attempting to report cover-ups of security issues, potential espionage, and incompetence. She was gagged by the State Secrets Privilege in her efforts to go to court on these issues, including a rejection in 2005 by the Supreme Court of the United States to hear her case without comment. Ms. Edmonds pursued a successful Freedom of Information Act (FOIA) Case to document the FBI's retaliation against her, and obtained critical findings from the U.S. Department of Justice Office of Inspector General confirming that the FBI had retaliated against her from reporting misconduct to the proper authorities.

==== Marvin Hobby (2002) ====
Marvin Hobby was a top ranking corporate officer at Georgia Power Company who reported safety issues at nuclear power plants. In 1989, Hobby informed upper management at the company that they were not following government policies as it prepared to turn over control of a plant in Waynesboro, Georgia. A few months later, Hobby was terminated from his position. In 1995, the Secretary of Labor issued a decision that found Georgia Power Company guilty of violating the whistleblower protection provisions of the Energy Reorganization Act of 1974 when they terminated Hobby. Twelve years after reporting his concerns, Hobby was paid $4 million by Georgia Power Co. for his suffering.

==== David Lewis (2002) ====
Dr. David Lewis was a senior research microbiologist with the U.S. Environmental Protection Agency. His research assessing the link between human health and use of treated sewage sludge prompted the Centers for Disease Control to issue guidelines protecting workers handling treated sewage sludge.

==== John Roberts (2002) ====
John Roberts was a former Unit Chief in the Federal Bureau of Investigation's Office of Professional Responsibility. In 2001, Roberts testified before the Senate Judiciary Committee about the pattern of misconduct surfacing at the highest level of the FBI.

Despite having obtained permission to appear on the CBS program 60 Minutes to discuss these matters, he was harassed and retaliated against for making public disclosures. This was the first case in FBI history that a senior-level manager was removed from his position based on his mistreatment of Mr. Roberts. The Roberts retaliation case led to federal legislation strengthening the Whistleblower Protection Act of 1989 to ensure FBI whistleblowers have the same rights under the law as any other federal employee.

==== Jane Turner (2002) ====
Jane Turner worked for the Federal Bureau of Investigation for over 25 years as FBI Special Agent who led the Bureau's highly successful program combating child sex crimes and crimes against women on Indian Reservations in North Dakota. Turner blew the whistle on the mishandling of child sex crime case, and in response to her reporting, was removed from her position in an act of retaliation. In 2005, the U.S Court of Appeals for the Eighth Circuit upheld the right of Turner to obtain a jury trial against the FBI and monetary damages.

Turner also blew the whistle after witnessing her colleagues stealing items from Ground Zero of 9/11 during inspections of the site. In 2007, Turner won the final judgement when the Department of Justice vetoed the FBI's appeal of a jury verdict that found the FBI guilty of illegal retaliation against Turner. Turner's case has since been used by the U.S. Government Accountability Office (GAO) and the U.S. Senate in understanding how to strengthen the FBI Whistleblower Program.

==== Aaron Westrick (2002) ====
Dr. Aaron Westrick was the research director for Second Chance Body Armor ("SCBA"), the largest manufacturer and supplier of body armor in the United States. Westrick witnessed a rapid decline in the quality of bulletproof vests being made with “Zylon” fiber after the material was scientifically proven to deteriorate at an alarming rate in certain environments. Westrick warned top officials at SCBA and Zylon manufacturer Toyobo Co. Ltd. that covering up defects and ignoring the problem would put federal, state, local and tribal law enforcement agencies' lives at risk and lead to disastrous consequences for the company.

In 2003, a California police officer was shot and killed while wearing a vest made with Zylon fiber, prompting Westrick to file a False Claims Act lawsuit against SCBA and Toyobo Co., Ltd. in 2004. In 2005, the United States Government intervened in the case on behalf of Westrick and after a 13-year legal battle with the Japanese manufacturer of Zylon, Toyobo Co. Ltd., the company agreed to pay a $66 million settlement to the United States for damages.

==== Bunny Greenhouse (2004) ====
Bunnatine "Bunny" Greenhouse is a former chief civilian contracting officer for the United States Army Corps of Engineers who in 2005, exposed illegal no-bid contracts for reconstruction in Iraq by a Halliburton subsidiary. The Army retaliated against Greenhouse by terminating her position as a high-level contractor. She testified before the Senate Democratic Policy Committee Hearing in 2007 about her experience blowing the whistle and the aftermath of her disclosure.

==== Cate Jenkins (2006) ====
Cate Jenkins worked for the Environmental Protection Agency (EPA) as a senior chemist. Jenkins wrote memos to the EPA Inspector General, U.S. Congress, and FBI detailing the chemical composition of dust from the September 11 attacks and its hazards to responders. She alerted The New York Times in 2006 and said in a 2009 CBS interview that the EPA explicitly lied about the danger of the dust which caused chemical burns in the lungs of responders, debilitating illnesses in many that included fatalities, and that it could have been prevented with proper safety equipment. Jenkins claims that the EPA has been misleading about evidence of debris inhalation hazards since the 1980s. She was fired and in 2012 successfully sued to be reinstated.

==== Daniel Richardson (2007) ====
Daniel Richardson is a former Senior District Business Manager for Bristol-Myers Squibb. With other whistleblowers, Richardson filed qui tam action against their employer for illegal drug pricing and marketing activities that resulted in increased Medicare and Medicaid costs. The company had to pay $515 million fines and penalties to resolve a broad array of federal and state civil allegations. Richardson and the other whistleblowers received a total of approximately $50 million in rewards.

=== Recent cases (Since 2010) ===
==== Bradley Birkenfeld (2012) ====
Bradley Birkenfeld is an American banker and whistleblower whose disclosures to the U.S. Department of Justice (DOJ), the U.S. Internal Revenue Service (IRS), the U.S. Securities and Exchange Commission and the U.S. Senate Committee on Homeland Security and Governmental Affairs led to a massive fraud investigation against the Swiss bank UBS, his former employer. In February 2009, as a result of the information he gave U.S. authorities, the DOJ announced it had reached a deferred prosecution agreement (DPA) with UBS that resulted in a $780 million fine and the release of previously privileged information on American tax evaders.

In 2008, Birkenfeld pleaded guilty to conspiracy to defraud the United States by abetting tax evasion by one of his clients and was sentenced in 2009 to 40 months in prison. Many advocacy groups from around the world criticized Birkenfeld's prosecution and sentence on the grounds that it would discourage financial industry whistleblowers. Birkenfeld subsequently fired his lawyers, Schertler and Onorato, and hired Kohn Kohn & Colapinto to represent him and his whistleblowing claims.

On 11 September 2012, the IRS Whistleblower Office awarded Birkenfeld $104 million as a whistleblower. Birkenfeld received the award under the IRS whistleblower program, which gives informants a percentage of money the U.S. government recovers after fraud is found. The award was the largest whistleblower payout in history, to either an individual or a group. It surpassed the $96 million awarded to GlaxoSmithKline whistleblower Cheryl D. Eckard in 2010.

The IRS explained its decision by citing Birkenfeld's "exceptional cooperation" and the "breadth and depth" of the information he provided, all of which led to "unprecedented actions" against UBS. IRS amnesty programs have since collected $5 billion from people who participated in UBS's illegal scheme based on the information provided by Birkenfeld.

==== Julio Escobar (2016) ====
Julio Escobar and his wife Carmen Correa filed a whistleblower lawsuit against the Universal Health Services (UHS) after the death of their teenage daughter Yarushka Rivera. Rivera died of a seizure after being treated at Arbour Counseling Services, a mental health service provider operated by UHS. An investigation into the death revealed that Arbour had violated the state Medicaid regulations during Rivera's treatment by allowing unlicensed and unsupervised clinicians to diagnose and prescribe medication. The unanimous Supreme Court decision on Universal Health v. Escobar set a significant precedent that permits corporations to be liable for fraud under the False Claims Act when they fail to disclose material non-compliance with regulatory requirements.

==== Howard Wilkinson (2018) ====
The firm also represented Howard Wilkinson, who blew the whistle on a money laundering scheme within the Estonian branch of Deutsche Bank. In 2018, details of the money laundering scheme became public, and it was revealed that the scheme involved $230 billion.

Howard Wilkinson is a former manager at Danske Bank who exposed what some call is the largest money laundering scandal in banking history. Wilkinson confidentially reported information of massive frauds internally, but his employer tried to cover up the crimes.

News of the $234 billion money laundering scandal, which involved turning Russian rubles into U.S. dollars, began to leak months after Wilkinson made his disclosures. Wilkinson resigned from Danske Bank for ethical reasons and signed a highly restrictive non-disclosure agreement as a condition for obtaining his severance. Wilkinson's name was illegally leaked to the press and he became the subject of a 60 Minutes segment.

In 2020, the Association of Certified Fraud Examiners (ACFE) awarded Wilkinson with the Cliff Robertson Sentinel Award “For Choosing Truth Over Self,” its highest honor.

==== Greek Novartis whistleblowers (2020) ====
Kohn, Kohn and Colapinto and Athens-based Greek law firm of Pavlos K. Sarakis & Associates jointly represented Greek whistleblowers who proved that the multinational Swiss-based pharmaceutical company Novartis paid millions in bribes to illegally market drugs in violation of the Foreign Corrupt Practices Act. Novartis was required to pay over $300 million in sanctions and fines to the U.S. Securities and Exchange Commission (SEC) and the U.S. Department of Justice (DOJ).

== Public interest advocacy ==
=== Securities Exchange Commission rulemaking ===
During the Dodd-Frank rule-making process, the firms partners worked closely with the SEC to create an effective whistleblower program. This resulted in the SEC approving KKC's recommendations that enhance and strengthen the whistleblower reward program:

- Establishing the right of corporate compliance officials and directors to obtain rewards; and
- Ensuring that employees who “participated” in fraud but did not “plan and initiate” the fraud, could receive rewards.

KKC attorneys chaired formal meetings with the Division of Enforcement, and individual meetings with each SEC Commissioner to present detailed reports and proposals setting forth rules that were essential to make the Dodd-Frank Act work as intended by Congress.

=== IRS rulemaking ===
The firm has filed numerous internal revenue service rulemaking petitions, extensive briefs and testified at IRS rulemaking hearings to strengthen the tax whistleblower program.

- November 29, 2012: KKC filed an extensive brief on behalf of the National Whistleblower Center before the IRS strongly urging it to reward whistleblowers who exposed criminal tax frauds.
- February 19, 2013: KKC authored an 84-page comment, on behalf of the NWC, on the proposed IRS whistleblower rules, actively opposing the criminal disqualification.
- April 16, 2013: One of the firm's tax whistleblower attorneys testified at the IRS rulemaking hearing opposing the criminal reward disqualification.
- June 5, 2014: We provided the Secretary of Treasury with an exhaustive 55-page scholarly article co-authored by KKC partner Stephen M. Kohn and Dean Zerbe that explained in detail the legal basis as to why the criminal reward disqualification was illegal and the why the IRS should not approve it. A copy of this article, published in Tax Notes, is available here.
- Finally, Dean Zerbe and Steve Kohn agreed to work with the legal team representing anonymous whistleblowers 21276/77-13W, to ensure that the IRS program correctly implemented the whistleblower reward laws and that any reward calculation included criminal fines and penalties.

On July 1, 2019, The Taxpayer First Act became law. The Taxpayer First Act closed loopholes in corporate whistleblower protections. Employees who expose tax fraud, which often include violations of the Bank Secrecy Act and anti-money laundering law, are protected from retaliation. These anti-retaliation provisions are:

- The right to reinstatement and double back-pay;
- No mandatory arbitration;
- Expeditious administrative remedies with the right to go to federal court for a jury trial;
- Compensatory damages such as special damage, attorneys fees, and costs, awarded only to a whistleblower who prevails in an employment case.

The Taxpayer First Act also enhances the existing IRS whistleblower reward program by permitting full and open communication between the IRS Whistleblower Office and whistleblowers.

=== National Whistleblower Center ===
Stephen Kohn, Michael Kohn, and David Colapinto founded the National Whistleblower Center in 1988. The National Whistleblower Center is a nonprofit organization that provides legal services to whistleblowers, promotes awareness and education for whistleblowers, and engages in grassroots advocacy.

=== Amicus curiae ===
The firm has sought to expand whistleblower protections by filing numerous amicus curiae briefs on behalf of whistleblowers and whistleblower advocacy groups. The firm has filed amicus briefs in the Supreme Court on a host of issues, from the constitutionality of the False Claims Act to the scope of numerous anti-retaliation or reward laws.

=== U.S. Senate and House of Representatives ===
The firm has represented numerous clients at oversight investigations and hearings conducted by the U.S. Senate and House of Representatives. Working pro bono, the firm's attorneys have also represented public interest organizations and whistleblowers at congressional policy and legislative hearings.

=== National Whistleblower Day ===
Led by Stephen Kohn and several other partner organization, National Whistleblower Appreciation Day is an annual recognition of whistleblowers whose actions have protected the American people from fraud or malfeasance. In 2018, the U.S. Senate unanimously passed a resolution to mark July 30 as the commemorative day led by Chuck Grassley.

==== Actions of the bill ====
2018-07-12	Passed/agreed to in Senate: Resolution agreed to in Senate without amendment and with a preamble by Unanimous Consent.
2018-07-12	Senate Committee on the Judiciary discharged by Unanimous Consent.
2018-06-28	Introduced in Senate

=== Congressional testimony ===
Kohn, Kohn & Colapinto has represented numerous clients at oversight investigations and hearings conducted by the U.S. Senate and House of Representatives.

Date of Hearing or Testimony	Hearing Topic
2007-09-21	Hearings before the Senate Democratic Policy Committee, “Abuses in Private Security and Reconstruction Contracting in Iraq: Ensuring Accountability, Protecting Whistleblowers,” Testimony on behalf of the National Whistleblower Center and as attorney for a witness.
2006-06-29	Hearings before the House Committee on Government Oversight, “What Price Free Speech? Whistleblowers and the Garcetti v. Ceballos Decision,” Testimony on behalf of the National Whistleblower Center.
2005-06-27	Hearings before the Senate Democratic Policy Committee, “An Oversight Hearing on Waste, Fraud and Abuse in U.S. Government Contracting in Iraq,” Attorney for a witness.
2003-11-12	Hearings before the Senate Committee on Governmental Affairs, “Hearing on S. 1538, the Federal Employee Protection of Disclosures Act,” Testimony on behalf of the National Whistleblower Center.
2000-03-22	Hearings before the House Committee on Science, “EPA’s Sludge Rule: Closed Minds or Open Debate,” Testimony on behalf of the National Whistleblower Center.
1999-05-10	Hearings before the Senate Judiciary Committee's Subcommittee on Administrative Oversight and the Courts, “Administrative Oversight of the Investigation of TWA Flight 800,” Attorney for a witness.
1997-09-29	Hearings before the Senate Judiciary Committee's Subcommittee on Administrative Oversight and the Courts, “Oversight Hearings on the FBI Crime Lab,” Testimony as attorney for a witness.
1997-05-13	Hearings before the House Judiciary Committee's Subcommittee on Crime, “Oversight Hearings on the Activities of the Federal Bureau of Investigation,” Attorney for a witness.
1993-05-06	Joint hearings before two subcommittees of the House Committee on Government Operations (Environment, Energy and Natural Resources; Legislation and National Security), “Elevation of the Environmental Protection Agency to a Cabinet-Level Department,” Testimony on behalf of the National Whistleblower Center.

== Firm achievements ==
=== Martindale-Hubbell AV Preeminent ===
Each of the partners of Kohn, Kohn and Colapinto, LLP have an AV Preeminent rating from the Martindale-Hubbell Bar Register of Preeminent Lawyers. This rating is based on a peer review survey conducted by Martindale-Hubbell, which reflects a combination of achieving a Very High General Ethical Standards rating and a Legal Ability numerical rating.

== Publications ==
=== Books on whistleblowing ===
Kohn, Stephen M. (2023). Rules for Whistleblowers : A Handbook for Doing What's Right. Essex, Connecticut. ISBN 978-1493059263. OCLC 1316697480.

Kohn, Stephen M. (2017). The new whistleblower's handbook : a step-by-step guide to doing what's right and protecting yourself. Guilford, Connecticut. ISBN 978-1-4930-2881-8. OCLC 988028023.

Kohn, Stephen M. (2011). The whistleblower's handbook : a step-by-step guide to doing what's right and protecting yourself. Guilford, Conn.: Lyons Press. ISBN 978-0-7627-6373-3. OCLC 666237654.

Kohn, Stephen M. (2001). Concepts and procedures in whistleblower law. Westport, Conn.: Quorum Books. ISBN 978-0-313-09614-3. OCLC 562383705.

Kohn, Stephen M. (1994). American political prisoners : prosecutions under the espionage and sedition acts. Westport, Conn.: Praeger. ISBN 978-0-313-02055-1. OCLC 518444481.

Kohn, Stephen M. (1991). The whistleblower litigation handbook : environmental, nuclear, health, and safety claims. Stephen M.. Kohn. New York: Wiley Law Publications. ISBN 0-471-55330-1. OCLC 23975325.

Kohn, Stephen M. (1988). The labor lawyer's guide to the rights and responsibilities of employee whistleblowers. Michael D. Kohn. New York: Quorum Books. ISBN 0-89930-207-6. OCLC 17678343.

Kohn, Stephen M. (1987). Jailed for peace : the history of American draft law violators, 1658-1985 (Paperback ed.). New York: Praeger. ISBN 0-275-92776-8. OCLC 15549306.

Kohn, Stephen M. (1985). Protecting environmental & nuclear whistleblowers : a litigation manual. Washington, D.C.: Nuclear Information and Resource Service, Government Accountability Project. ISBN 0-9615323-0-0. OCLC 12684561.
