= Revenue ruling =

Revenue rulings are public administrative rulings by the Internal Revenue Service (IRS) in the United States Department of the Treasury of the United States federal government which apply the law to particular factual situations. A revenue ruling can be relied on as precedent by all taxpayers.

== Function and authority ==
A revenue ruling is "an official interpretation by the Internal Revenue Service that has been published in the Internal Revenue Bulletin. Revenue rulings are issued only by the National Office and are published for the information and guidance of taxpayers, Internal Revenue Service officials, and others concerned." Revenue rulings are published "to promote correct and uniform application of the tax laws by Internal Revenue Service employees and to assist taxpayers in attaining maximum voluntary compliance by informing Service personnel and the public of National Office interpretations of the internal revenue laws, related statutes, treaties, regulations, and statements of Service procedures affecting the rights and duties of taxpayers."

A taxpayer may, for a fee, seek advice from the IRS on the proper tax treatment of a transaction. This document in which this advice is given is called a private letter ruling. A letter ruling binds only the IRS and the requesting taxpayer, so it may not be cited or relied on for precedent.

The IRS does have the option of redacting the text of a private ruling and issuing it as a revenue ruling, which may become binding on all taxpayers and the IRS. "Even if it is clear that the taxpayer did not rely on a revenue ruling, courts will often hold the Service to the position expressed in the revenue ruling."

Revenue rulings are published in both the Internal Revenue Bulletin and the Federal Register. The numbering system for revenue rulings corresponds to the year in which they are issued. For example, Revenue Ruling 79-24 was the twenty-fourth revenue ruling issued in 1979.

Public administrative rulings are part of second-tier authorities and are subordinate to the Internal Revenue Code and other statutes, Treasury regulations, treaties, and court decisions. They hold higher weight than third-tier authorities, such as legislative history and private letter rulings. Revenue rulings can be used to avoid certain IRS penalties.

== Comparison with revenue procedures ==
Revenue rulings are different from revenue procedures. A revenue procedure is an official statement of a procedure that affects the rights or duties of taxpayers under the law, while a revenue ruling is the conclusion of the IRS on how the law is applied to a specific set of facts. Generally, a revenue ruling states the IRS position, whereas a revenue procedure provides return filing or other instructions concerning the IRS position.

For example, a revenue ruling holds that taxpayers may deduct certain automobile expenses, and a revenue procedure provides that taxpayers entitled to deduct these automobile expenses may compute them by applying certain mileage rates in lieu of determining actual operating expenses.

Revenue rulings and revenue procedures are alike in that both are issued only by the National Office and both are for the information and guidance of taxpayers.

== Significant rulings ==
- Revenue Ruling 74-77, on damages for alienation of affections or for the surrender of the custody of a child
- Revenue Ruling 87–41, on the distinction between an employee and an independent contractor.
