= Whistleblower Protection Act of 1778 =

- Long title: That it is the duty of all persons in the service of the United States, as well as all other the inhabitants thereof, to give the earliest information to Congress or other proper authority of any misconduct, frauds or misdemeanors committed by any officers or persons in the service of these states, which may come to their knowledge.
- Effective: July 30, 1778

Legislative history
- Signed into law by President Henry Laurens on July 30, 1778

The Whistleblower Protection Act of 1778 was an Act of Congress passed by the Second Continental Congress and signed into law by President of the Continental Congress Henry Laurens in 1778. It was the first piece of legislation concerning whistleblower protection in the United States passed by Congress. The act was created as a result of Continental Navy officer Esek Hopkins being reported on by fellow officers for torturing British prisoners of war. Congressional politicians, aware of the burdens the act placed on American civil servants, included in the act a provision for legal expenses in the event that whistleblowers were the subject of legal proceedings. Laurens signed the act into law in York, Pennsylvania on July 30, 1778.

== Origins of 1778 Whistleblower Act ==
The Whistleblower Protection Act of 1778 was the first piece of legislation concerning whistleblower protection in the United States passed by the Second Continental Congress. The act was created as a result of the actions of Continental Navy officer Commodore Esek Hopkins, who was reported on by ten fellow officers in February 1777, including Richard Marven and Samuel Shaw, for torturing British prisoners of war imprisoned onboard the frigate USS Warren while it was in the Providence River. The whistleblowers reported on Hopkins' use of torture by filing a petition to the Eastern Navy Board, then the Marine Committee, and ultimately the Second Continental Congress. Congressional politicians, aware of the burdens the act placed on American civil servants, included in the act a provision for legal expenses in the event that whistleblowers were the subject of legal proceedings. President of the Continental Congress Henry Laurens signed the act into law in York, Pennsylvania on July 30, 1778.

The petition went as follows:

The Complaint Petitions as Filed by the Continental Navy Mariners

On Board the Warren - Feby 19, 1777

To the Honorable Marine Committee

Much respected Gentlemen

We, who present this petition, engaged on board the ship Warren, with as earnest desire and fixed expectations of doing our country Some Service; we are still anxious for the weal of America, and wish nothing more earnestly than to see her in peace and prosperity. We are ready to hazard every thing that is dear, and if necessary, Sacrifice our lives for the welfare of our country. We are desirous of being active in the defense of our constitutional liberties and privileges against the unjust cruel claims of tyranny and oppression, but as things are now circumstanced on board the frigate there seems to be no prospect of our being serviceable in our present stations. We have been in this Situation for a considerable space of time. We are personally well acquainted with the real character and conduct of our commander, commodore Hopkins, and we take this Method, not having a more convenient opportunity, of sincerely and humbly petitioning the Honorable Marine Committee that they would inquire into his character and conduct, for we suppose that his Character is such, and that he has been guilty of such crimes as render him quite unfit for the publick department he now occupies, which crimes we the Subscribers can Sufficiently attest.

P.S. Captain Grannis the bearer of this will be able to give all the information desired.

- Roger Haddock
- John Truman
- James Browden
- John Grannis
- John Reed
- Jas Sellers
- Richard Marven
- George Stillman
- Barnabas Lothrop
- Samuel Shaw

On Board the Ship Warren - Feby 23, 1777

The regard which I have for my country has induced me to write the following accusation against Commodore Hopkins.

First, I know him to be a man of no principles, and quite unfit for the important trust reposed in him. I have often heard him curse the honorable marine committee in the very words following. God damn them. They are a pack of damned fools. If I should follow their directions, the whole country would be ruined. I am not going to follow their directions, by God. Such profane Swearing is his common conversations, in which respect he Sets a very wicked and detestable example both to his Officers and Men. Tis my humble opinion that if he continues to have the command, all the Officers, who have any regard to their own characters, will be obliged very soon to quit the service of their country. When the frigates were at Newport, before the British fleet took possession of that place, more than a hundred men, who were discharged from the Army, the most of them Seamen, were willing to come on board the ships and assisting carrying them to Boston, or any other harbour to the Eastward, in order that they might be maned, but commodore Hopkins utterly refused, being determined to keep them in this state, from which, we have not been able, after all our pains, to procure a single man for this Ship. He has treated prisoners in a very unbecoming barbarous manner. His Character and conduct are Such, in this part of the country, that I can see no prospect of the fleets being maned.

- Jas Sellers

Ship Warren - Feby 24, 1777

The following lines contain the reasons why we signed the petition against Commodore Hopkins, we consider him, on the account of his real Character, quite unfit for the important publick Stations wherein he now pretends to act. We know him to be from his conversation and conduct, a man destitute of the principles, both of religion and Morality. We likewise know that he Sets the most impious example both to his officers and Men by frequently profaning the name of almighty God, and by ridiculing virtue. We know him to be one principle obstacle [sic], or reason why this Ship is not man'd; and people are afraid to engage in the fleet through fear of their being turned over to this Ship. We have considered it as an indispensable duty we owe our country Sincerely to petition the Honorable Marine Committee that his conduct and character be inquired into for as things are now circumstanced, we greatly fear these frigates will not be in a Situation capable of doing America any service.

- Richard Marven
- George Stillman
- Barnabas Lothrop

Commodore Hopkins is very much blamed by people here for not destroying a British frigate when on ground a few days ago in this River, and we suppose very justly.

- Jas Sellers
- Richard Marven

Ship Warren - Feby 24, 1777

I the Subscriber have heard Commodore Hopkins Say that the Continental Congress were a pack of ignorant Lawyers Clerks and that they know nothing at all. I also have heard him Say, when earnestly persuaded to remove the fleet to Boston, being in constant expectation that this river would be blocked up, the Ships Shall not go to Boston, by God.

- Pr. James Brewer

Ship Warren - Feby 24, 1777

I the Subscriber, can attest that our Commander Commodore Hopkins has Spoken very abusively concerning the Honorable Congress; calling that respectable assembly, who ought to be considered as the guardians of American liberty, a pack of ignorant lawyers Clerks, who know nothing at all.

- John Truman

Ship Warren - Feby 24, 1777

I the Subscriber have heard Commodore Hopkins assert that the Continental Congress were a pack of damned rascals; the best of them were lawyers Clerks, and knew nothing of their business; that he, his self, intended to leave the Navy and go to Philadelphia in order that the Congress might have Somebody there who knew Something, for Shame and destruction might be the portion of the American fleet unless he undertook to negotiate that affair.

- Samuel Shaw

On Board the Warren - Feby 24th, 1777

I, the Subscriber do know that our commander, Commodore Hopkins allows himself to Speak in the most disrespectful Manner concerning the honour ye Continental Congress although I have lived in the cabin with him. I do not remember that he ever once has Spoken well of those guardians of America, but Seems to embrace with pleasure every opportunity in order to disparage and Slander them. He does not hesitate to call them a pack of ignorant fellows — lawyers clerks — persons that don't know how to govern — Men who are unacquainted with their business, who are unacquainted with the nature of Mankind, that if their precepts and measures are complied with the country will be ruined. I have also, heard him say that he would not obey the Congress. He not only talks about them most disrespectfully among our own folks, but I have heard him exert himself earnestly in order to disparage them before Strangers, before two prisoners, who were Masters of vessels on their passage to New-port in order to be exchanged. He also positively asserts that all mankind are exactly alike — That no man yet ever existed who could not be bought. That any person living might be hired with money to do any action whatsoever; this he also asserted in the hearing of the before mentioned prisoners, for what reason I can't determine, unless he was desirous of making a bargain with Sr. Peter Parker. He allow's himself in anger and in common conversation, to take the name of God in vain, he is remarkably addicted to profane Swearing; in this respect, as well as in many other respects, he sets his Officers and Men a most irreligious and impious example. He has treated prisoners in the most inhuman and barbarous manner. I very well know, by hear say, how he has conducted in regard to his men's being paid off, and being discharged when the term of time for which they engaged was expired. In this part of America, people are afraid of him; they are jealous of him; and he is an effectual obstacle to the fleets being properly Maned. He is very much blamed by people here, for not destroying a British frigate when on ground a few days ago, in this river. I am not prejudiced against the Man, My own conscience, the regard I have for my country, and the advice and earnest desire of many respectable gentlemen have induced me to write what I have written.

- John Reed

== See also ==
- Military Whistleblower Protection Act
- Whistleblower Protection Act
- Whistleblower protection in the United States

== Reading bibliography ==
Field, Edward (1898). "Esek Hopkins, Commander-in-Chief of the Continental Navy During the American Revolution ~ 1775 to 1778". Internet Archive. Providence, Rhode Island: The Preston & Rounds Co. pp. 141–236. LCCN 99000033. OCLC 3430958.
Hopkins, Esek (1932). Beck, Alverda Sammis (ed.). "The Letter Book of Esek Hopkins, Commander-in-Chief of the United States Navy ~ 1775-1777". Internet Archive. Providence, Rhode Island: Rhode Island Historical Society. OCLC 1238112565.
