= Murphy v. IRS =

- Court: United States Court of Appeals for the District of Columbia Circuit
- Full case name: Marrita Murphy and Daniel J. Leveille v. Internal Revenue Service and United States of America
- Argued: February 24, 2006
- Reargued: April 23, 2007
- Decided: August 22, 2006
- Citations: 460 F.3d 79 (D.C. Cir. 2006); 2006-2 U.S. Tax Cas. (CCH) ¶ 50,476; 2006 WL 2411372

Case history
- Prior history: 362 F. Supp. 2d 206 (D.D.C. 2005)
- Subsequent history: Vacated on rehearing, 493 F.3d 170 (D.C. Cir. July 3, 2007), 2007-2 U.S. Tax Cas. (CCH) ¶ 50,531; Rehearing en banc denied, September 14, 2007.

Court membership
- Judges sitting: Douglas H. Ginsburg, Judith Ann Wilson Rogers, Janice Rogers Brown

Case opinions
- Majority: Ginsburg, joined by Rogers, Brown

Laws applied
- Sixteenth Amendment; Internal Revenue Code

Marrita Murphy and Daniel J. Leveille, Appellants v. Internal Revenue Service and United States of America, Appellees (commonly known as Murphy v. IRS), is a tax case in which the United States Court of Appeals for the District of Columbia Circuit originally held that the taxation of emotional distress awards by the federal government is unconstitutional. That decision was vacated, or rendered void, by the Court on December 22, 2006. The Court eventually overturned its original decision, finding against Murphy in an opinion issued on July 3, 2007.

The July 3, 2007 decision was that the taxpayer's recovery could be taxed under Article I, Section 8 of the Constitution even if the recovery were not "income" under the Sixteenth Amendment. The Court conceded that this rationale for granting a rehearing and overturning the original decision was not in the government's original appeal, and would not normally have been considered under the Court's rules. The Court indicated that the issue was of such importance, affecting "the broad public interest", that the new argument could be entertained.

== The original decision ==
The Court had issued its original opinion, written by Chief Judge Douglas H. Ginsburg and joined by Judges Judith Rogers and Janice Rogers Brown, on August 22, 2006. The opinion had struck down 26 U.S.C. § 104(a)(2) to the extent that the statute purported to categorize compensatory damages for emotional distress and loss of reputation as being includible in gross income for Federal income tax purposes.

Marrita Murphy was represented by David K. Colapinto of the law firm Kohn, Kohn & Colapinto, who also handled her appeal before the D.C. Circuit. Murphy had sued to recover income taxes that she paid on the compensatory damages for emotional distress and loss of reputation that she was awarded in an action against her former employer under whistle-blower statutes for reporting environmental hazards on her former employer's property to state authorities. Murphy had claimed both physical and emotional-distress damages as a result of her former employer's retaliation and mistreatment.

In a prior administrative proceeding, Murphy had been awarded compensatory damages of $70,000, of which $45,000 was for "emotional distress or mental anguish" and $25,000 was for "injury to professional reputation." Murphy reported the $70,000 award as part of her "gross income" and paid $20,665 in Federal income taxes based upon the award.

Section 104(a)(2) of the Internal Revenue Code excludes, from gross income, amounts "received . . . on account of personal physical injuries." The statute provides that for purposes of that exclusion, "emotional distress shall not be treated as a physical injury or physical sickness." Based on that provision, Murphy sought a refund of the full amount of tax, arguing that the award should be exempt from taxation both because the award was "in fact" to compensate for "physical personal injuries" and because the award was not "income" within the meaning of the Sixteenth Amendment.

Interpreting Section 104(a)(2), the D.C. Circuit first held in August 2006 that the damages at issue did not fall within the scope of the statute because the damages were not in fact to compensate for "personal physical injuries," and thus could not be excluded from gross income under that provision.

The D.C. Circuit next analyzed whether Section 104(a)(2) is "constitutional," relying upon language from Commissioner v. Glenshaw Glass Co. to the effect that, under the Sixteenth Amendment, Congress may "tax all gains" or "accessions to wealth." Murphy argued that her award was neither a gain nor an accession to wealth because it compensated her for nonphysical injuries, and was thus effectively a restoration of "human capital."

Recognizing that the Supreme Court has long held that a restoration of capital "[i]s not income," and thus is not taxable, and that personal injury recoveries have traditionally been considered "nontaxable on the theory that they roughly correspond to a return of capital," the D.C. Circuit accepted Murphy's argument in its August 2006 decision. The D.C. Circuit reasoned that Murphy's award for emotional distress or loss of reputation is not taxable because her damages "were awarded to make Murphy emotionally and reputationally 'whole' and not to compensate her for lost wages or taxable earnings of any kind." The D.C. Circuit also explained that a 1918 opinion of the Attorney General stating that proceeds from an accident insurance policy were not taxable income and a 1922 IRS ruling that damages based on loss of reputation were not taxable income, both issued relatively near the Sixteenth Amendment's ratification in 1913, support its ruling. The D.C. Circuit thus concluded that "the framers of the Sixteenth Amendment would not have understood compensation for a personal injury – including a nonphysical injury – to be income." Murphy's position was that her award constituted only monies that "made her whole" and, in effect, was a return of her "human capital."

== Judgment vacated ==
The Department of Justice asked for a rehearing en banc (i.e., a hearing before all the members of the Court, rather than before only the panel of three judges who made the original decision).

The original three judges then agreed to rehear the case themselves. The original August 2006 judgment, which had been mandatory precedent only in the District of Columbia, was vacated.

== Rehearing and decision ==
The parties presented oral arguments in a rehearing on April 23, 2007,

On July 3, 2007, the Court ruled (1) that the taxpayer's compensation was received on account of a non-physical injury or sickness; (2) that gross income under section 61 of the Internal Revenue Code does include compensatory damages for non-physical injuries, even if the award is not an "accession to wealth," (3) that the income tax imposed on an award for non-physical injuries is an indirect tax, regardless of whether the recovery is restoration of "human capital," and therefore the tax does not violate the constitutional requirement of Article I, section 9, that capitations or other direct taxes must be laid among the states only in proportion to the population; (4) that the income tax imposed on an award for non-physical injuries does not violate the constitutional requirement of Article I, section 8, that all duties, imposts and excises be uniform throughout the United States; (5) that under the doctrine of sovereign immunity, the Internal Revenue Service may not be sued in its own name. The Court stated: "[a]lthough the 'Congress cannot make a thing income which is not so in fact,' [ . . . ] it can label a thing income and tax it, so long as it acts within its constitutional authority, which includes not only the Sixteenth Amendment but also Article I, Sections 8 and 9." Citing Commissioner v. Banks, the court noted that "the power of the Congress to tax income 'extends broadly to all economic gains.'" The court ruled that Ms. Murphy was not entitled to the tax refund she claimed, and that the personal injury award she received was "within the reach of the congressional power to tax under Article I, Section 8 of the Constitution"—even if the award was "not income within the meaning of the Sixteenth Amendment".

== Appeal of July 2007 decision ==
Murphy's attorneys, led by David K. Colapinto of Kohn, Kohn & Colapinto, requested a rehearing of the July 2007 decision by the full Court of Appeals (en banc) for the District of Columbia Circuit, which was denied on September 14, 2007. On December 17, 2007, Murphy filed a petition with the U.S. Supreme Court asking for a review of the decision of the Court of Appeals. The Supreme Court denied review of the decision on April 21, 2008.

== See also ==
- Revenue Ruling 74-77
