= Stephen M. Kohn =

American lawyer

- Education: Boston University (BS); Brown University (MA); Northeastern University School of Law (JD)
- Occupations: Attorney, Whistleblower advocate
- Years active: 1988-present
- Organization(s): Kohn, Kohn and Colapinto; National Whistleblower Center
- Website: kkc.com

Stephen Martin Kohn is an attorney and founding partner at Kohn, Kohn & Colapinto, a Washington, D.C., law firm specializing in Whistleblower Protection Law. The author of the first legal treatise on whistleblowing, Kohn is recognized as one of the top experts in whistleblower protection law. He also has written on the subject of political prisoners and the history of the abrogation of the rights of political protestors.

== Biography ==
Kohn is a graduate of Boston University (B.S. in Social Education. 1979) and Brown University (M.A. in political science, '81); he received his J.D. degree from Northeastern University in 1984. While at Boston University, Kohn was one of the founders of the B.U. Exposure, a student-run independent newspaper dedicated to exposing the ethical irregularities of the administration of B.U. president John Silber.

After graduating from Northeastern Law, Kohn served as an adjunct professor and clinical supervisor at the Antioch School of Law, where he oversaw a legal clinic on whistleblower protections from 1984-88. He also served as the clinical director and director of corporate litigation for the Government Accountability Project.

Kohn has represented whistleblowers in the O. J. Simpson murder case, the 1993 World Trade Center bombing cases, the Oklahoma City bombing case, the Linda Tripp-Privacy Act case, and the Bradley Birkenfeld-UBS AG tax evasion case. One of the firm's clients was Dr. Frederic Whitehurst, a supervisor at the FBI Crime Lab, who blew the whistle on the bureau and its tainting of forensic evidence for use by prosecutors. Kohn introduced Whitehurst's 1995 testimony before the House Subcommittee on Crime.

In 2006, Kohn was the Daynard Public Interest Visiting Fellow at his law alma mater, Northeastern Law. He is the founder and chairman of the board of the National Whistleblower Center and attorney-trustee for the National Whistleblower Legal Defense and Education Fund.

== Publications ==
=== Books ===
- Rules for Whistleblowers: A Handbook for Doing What's Right (Lyons Press, 2023)
- The New Whistleblower's Handbook: A Step-by-step Guide to Doing What's Right and Protecting Yourself (Lyons Press, 2017).
- The Whistleblower's Handbook: A Step-by-step Guide to Doing What's Right and Protecting Yourself (Globe Pequot, 2011).
- Whistleblower Law: A Guide to Legal Protections for Corporate Employees (Praeger, 2004).
- Concepts and Procedures in Whistleblower Law (Greenwood Press, 2000)
- American Political Prisoners (Praeger, 1994).
- The Whistleblower Litigation Handbook (Wiley Law, 1991)
- The Labor Lawyers Guide to the Rights and Responsibilities of Employee Whistleblowers Greenwood Press, 1988)
- Jailed for Peace ( Greenwood Press, 1986)
- Protecting Environmental and Nuclear Whistleblowers: A Litigation Manual (NIRS, 1985)

=== Articles ===
- "Corporate Whistleblower Protection and Analysis", The Employee Advocate (Winter 2002/2003).
- "Proving Motive in Whistleblower Cases", Trial (March 2002)
- "Environmental Whistleblowers and the Eleventh Amendment: Employee Protection or State Immunity", 15 Tulane Environmental Law Journal 43 (Winter, 2001)
- "Modern Trends in Protection of Employees under State Whistleblower Laws: A Model Statute", Vol. II, ALA National College of Advocacy Reference Materials, p. 1789 (Washington, D.C. 1998)
- "The Crisis in Environmental Whistleblower Protection: Deficiencies in the Regulations Protecting Employees Who Disclose Violations of Environmental Laws or Testify" in 'Citizen Suits', 2 New England Environmental Law Forum 1 (New England School of Law, 1995)
- "The Fort Leavenworth General Strike", a chapter in Nonviolence in America: A Documentary History, Staughton and Alice Lynd, editors (Orbis Books, Maryknoll, N.Y. 1995)
- "An Overview of Federal and State Whistleblower Protection", 4 Antioch Law Journal 99 (Summer, 1986)
- "Nuclear Whistleblower Protection and the Scope of Protected Activity Under Section 210 of the Energy Reorganization Act", 4 Antioch Law Journal 73 (Summer, 1986)
- "Conscientious Objection: A Constitutional Right", 21 New England Law Review 545 (1986) (co-author, the Hon. Frederick L. Brown, Associate Justice, Massachusetts Court of Appeals).
- "Human Rights and Freedom of Conscience in Administrative Law: A Critique of the Fugitive Slave Act and the Selective Service Act Through Use of the Liberty Fact Doctrine", 61 University of Detroit Journal of Urban Law 177 (Winter, 1984) (co-author, the Hon. Frederick L. Brown, Associate Justice, Massachusetts Court of Appeals)
- "Whistleblowing and Environmental Protection", a contribution in the Macmillan Guide to Pollution (Macmillan Reference, N.Y. 2002-03).
