= National Whistleblower Center =

The National Whistleblower Center (NWC) is a nonprofit, nonpartisan, tax exempt, educational and advocacy organization based in Washington, D.C. It was founded in 1988 by the lawyers Kohn, Kohn & Colapinto, LLP. As of June 2021, Siri Nelson is the executive director. Since its founding, the center has worked on whistleblower cases relating to environmental protection, nuclear safety, government and corporate accountability, and wildlife crime.

== Programs ==
NWC operates three main programs: (1) providing whistleblowers with legal assistance, (2) advocating for policies that protect and reward whistleblowers such as the Dodd–Frank Act, the Sarbanes–Oxley Act, and the Whistleblower Protection Enhancement Act, and (3) educating the public about the importance of whistleblowers to preserving democracy and the rule of law. The NWC strongly opposes efforts to weaken existing laws and pushes for strengthening laws protecting whistleblowers across sectors.

Starting in 2013, the U.S. Senate has recognized National Whistleblower Appreciation Day each year on July 30 at the urging of Senator Chuck Grassley, a founding member of the Whistleblower Protection Caucus in Congress. National Whistleblower Day Appreciation honors the anniversary of the United States' first whistleblower law, passed on July 30, 1778, during the height of the Revolutionary War. The National Whistleblower Center has hosted an annual celebration on the day to honor and celebrate the contributions of whistleblowers. Past speakers have included prominent members of Congress, agency heads, whistleblowers, and whistleblower advocates.

== NWC Accomplishments ==
In addition to protecting the jobs and careers of numerous whistleblowers, the center's victories include the following:

- Winning reinstatement for the highest ranking nuclear whistleblower;
- Collecting millions of dollars in damages on behalf of whistleblowers;
- Using the Freedom of Information Act (United States) to force government agencies to release hundreds of thousands of pages of information documenting government misconduct;
- Exposing misconduct at the World Trade Center and the 9/11 crime scenes, including theft by FBI agents and the mishandling of evidence;
- Documenting deficiencies in the FBI's counterterrorism program;
- Requiring the FBI to create whistleblower protection for FBI agents for the first time in U.S. history;
- Forcing the FBI to accredit its crime lab;
- Forcing the United States Attorney General to withdraw gag orders on government employees who desired to expose ethical violations to Members of Congress;
- Successfully worked with Congress to ensure passage of critical whistleblower protection laws, such as the No-FEAR Act, the Sarbanes-Oxley Corporate Whistleblower Protection Act, and the Civil Rights Tax Relief Act;
- Forcing President Bush to withdraw his nomination for head of enforcement at the United States Environmental Protection Agency due to former retaliation against whistleblowers;
- Preventing federal agencies from gagging employee speech critical of agency policies;
- Banning "hush money" payments for all environmental and nuclear federal safety cases;
- Exposing the vulnerabilities of U.S. nuclear power plants to airborne terrorist attacks and forcing reforms in the U.S. Nuclear Regulatory Commission;
- Ensuring that military whistleblowers are informed of their rights by the Department of Defense;
- Establishing numerous legal precedents strengthening whistleblower protections for public and private sector employees, including expanding the scope of protected whistleblower speech, enjoining government regulations which restricted whistleblowing, and expanding the use of the Privacy Act to prevent the government from smearing its critics.

== Prominent NWC whistleblowers ==
=== Bradley (Brad) Birkenfeld ===
Brad Birkenfeld is a former banker and wealth manager with UBS who exposed massive tax evasion in the Swiss banking system. He made history in 2012 when he received the largest ever whistleblower reward of $104 million from the IRS Office of the Whistleblower for reporting tax fraud. His disclosures resulted in unprecedented recoveries for US taxpayers with over $5 billion collected from US citizens with illegal "undeclared" offshore accounts and $780 million paid in fines and penalties by UBS.

=== Marrita Murphy ===
In Murphy v. IRS, whistleblower Marrita Murphy (represented by David K. Colapinto, general counsel for the National Whistleblower Center) challenged the constitutionality of taxing compensatory damages in civil rights/whistleblower cases. In August 2006, a unanimous panel of the U.S. Court of Appeals for the District of Columbia Circuit ruled in favor of Ms. Murphy, and declared unconstitutional a special tax Congress had passed in 1996, which targeted civil rights victims who received compensation for emotional distress damages. However, in July 2007, the U.S. Court of Appeals for the District of Columbia Circuit reversed itself on the case, holding that the IRS can tax damage awards based solely on compensating victims who suffer emotional injuries.

=== Bunnatine (Bunny) Greenhouse ===
Bunny Greenhouse, former chief contracting officer of the United States Army Corps of Engineers, testified in June 2005 before a Democratic party public committee. Her testimony included allegations against Halliburton of instances of waste, fraud and other abuses with regards to its operations in the Iraq War. After standing up and "blowing the whistle", she was demoted and removed from her position as the chief civilian contracting authority of the Corps. In July 2011, she won close to $1 million in full restitution of lost wages, compensatory damages, and attorney fees.

=== Jane Turner ===
In 1999, former FBI special agent Jane Turner brought to the attention of her management team serious misconduct concerning failures to investigate and prosecute crimes against children in Indian Country and in the Minot, North Dakota community. Turner also reported on misconduct related to the potential criminal theft of property from the 9/11 Ground Zero crime scene in New York City by Minneapolis FBI personnel. Although she was considered one of the best agents working in Indian Country, Turner's twenty-five year career with the FBI was brought to a halt when she was forced from service as retaliation for what FBI management termed as "tarnishing" the image of the FBI.

=== Dr. Frederic Whitehurst ===
Dr. Frederic Whitehurst is the executive director of the NWC's Forensic Justice Project. Whitehurst received a Ph.D. in chemistry from Duke University, and a J.D. from Georgetown University. He joined the FBI in 1982 and served as a Supervisory Special Agent in the FBI crime lab from 1986 - 1998. In the lab, he observed procedural errors and misconduct by agents and as a result went public as a whistleblower. He retired after winning the first-ever whistleblower case against the FBI.

=== Dr. Marsha Coleman-Adebayo ===
Dr. Marsha Coleman-Adebayo was a senior policy analyst for the United States Environmental Protection Agency (EPA). She founded two employee-rights groups, EPA Employees Against Racial Discrimination and the No FEAR coalition. Through her leadership, the No FEAR Coalition, working closely with Representative James Sensenbrenner, organized a successful grass-roots campaign and obtained overwhelming Congressional support for the "Notification of Federal Employees Anti-discrimination and Retaliation Act". The Act was signed into law by President Bush in 2002.

=== Dr. Jonathan Fishbein ===
The center has championed the case of one of the highest ranking drug whistleblowers in American history, Dr. Jonathan Fishbein. Fishbein exposed a series of unethical and improper medical problems within the National Institutes of Health's drug safety clinical trials program. In the wake of Fishbein's allegations, the United States Department of Health and Human Services enacted sweeping conflict of interest reforms and promised protection of senior ranking employees who blow the whistle. Additionally, drug companies have instituted voluntary reforms in an effort to circumvent congressional acts. Regardless of the scandals that have rocked the drug agency, Congress has still not enacted federal protection for drug whistleblowers.

== Unionization Controversy ==
Lindsey Williams worked as director of advocacy for the National Whistleblower Center, but was laid off in 2012 after attempting to unionize the small workforce. She was offered a severance package but rejected it because of a confidentiality clause that would have prevented her from discussing her experiences. She appealed to the National Labor Relations Board, and eventually settled the case with her former employer.
