= Imperium (2016 film) =

2016 American crime thriller film

- Theatrical release poster
- Directed by: Daniel Ragussis
- Screenplay by: Daniel Ragussis
- Story by: Michael German
- Produced by: Simon Taufique; Dennis Lee; Daniel Ragussis; Ty Walker
- Starring: Daniel Radcliffe; Toni Collette; Tracy Letts; Devin Druid; Pawel Szajda; Néstor Carbonell; Sam Trammell
- Cinematography: Bobby Bukowski
- Edited by: Sara Corrigan
- Music by: Will Bates
- Production companies: Grindstone Entertainment Group; Sculptor Media; Atomic Features; Tycor International Film Company; Green-Light International
- Distributed by: Lionsgate Premiere
- Release date: August 19, 2016 (United States)
- Running time: 109 minutes
- Country: United States
- Language: English
- Box office: $302,109

Imperium is a 2016 American crime thriller film starring Daniel Radcliffe as an FBI agent who goes undercover to investigate a possible conspiracy enacted by American white supremacists. The film also stars Toni Collette, Tracy Letts, Devin Druid, Pawel Szajda, Néstor Carbonell, and Sam Trammell. It was written and directed by Daniel Ragussis (in his feature film debut) from a story by former FBI agent Michael German.

Imperium was released on August 19, 2016, in a limited release and through video on demand by Lionsgate Premiere. It received positive reviews from critics.

== Plot ==
Nate Foster is a young FBI Special Agent working to uncover highly classified terrorist plots. After some illegally imported caesium-137 is stolen, Nate is recruited by Angela Zamparo, a fellow FBI Special Agent, who suspects the involvement of white supremacist groups.

Through Zamparo's connections, Foster is introduced to a small group of Neo-Nazis led by Vince Sargent, a local leader who is familiar with their prime suspect, alt-right talk radio host Dallas Wolf. Wolf, a figurehead in the movement for his incendiary rhetoric, assembles a gathering of the largest and most influential groups in the northeast. With Sargent's introductions, Foster becomes ingratiated in the movement and meets Andrew Blackwell, the leader of a premier white supremacist militia, as well as gaining Wolf's attention by convincing him he can fund an expansion of his radio show. Foster also becomes fast friends with Gerry Conway, a white collar engineer and family man, also a white supremacist.

After earning Blackwell's trust by saving him during an attack on a white power rally by antifascists, Foster is brought to a crude military complex operated by his militia. There, Blackwell reveals that he has blueprints for the municipal water network of Washington, D.C., and is plotting an attack.

The FBI begins to suspect that Wolf and Blackwell are working together after Foster meets Wolf at his home and discovers that his house sets off Foster's Geiger counter. Foster attempts to integrate himself into a possible plot by offering Wolf a substantial financial investment.

Instead, Wolf becomes hostile and reports Foster to the FBI. It is revealed that he sees himself as merely an entertainer, does not truly believe in the cause, and has undergone radiation therapy for prostate cancer, which was registered by the Geiger counter. Blackwell is meanwhile also dismissed as a possible threat, as he appears to use the D.C. water network plans as a way to lure in potential recruits with promise of participating in an impending terror attack. With no further leads, the case is ordered to be closed by Foster's and Zamparo's superior. Angered at wasting his efforts, Foster prepares to have his cover identity leave the city.

Foster meets Conway to make his final farewells. Sensing his genuine feelings of uselessness, Conway confides in Foster his membership in a domestic terrorist cell. It is revealed that Conway and his allies are in possession of the caesium and are plotting to detonate a dirty bomb. With Conway's introduction, Foster joins the group as supplier of the explosive (TATP). Though his cover is nearly blown several times by the paranoid terrorists, Foster manages to locate the caesium in Conway's home, leading the FBI to stop and arrest the terrorists before they are able to carry out the plot. Satisfied that he has made a difference, Foster makes one last visit to Johnny, a teenager and former member of Sargent's gang who no longer believes in the cause.

== Cast ==
- Daniel Radcliffe as Nate Foster
- Toni Collette as Angela Zamparo
- Tracy Letts as Dallas Wolf
- Sam Trammell as Gerry Conway
- Néstor Carbonell as Tom Hernandez
- Roger Yawson as Usman
- Devin Druid as Johnny
- Pawel Szajda as Vince Sargent
- Chris Sullivan as Andrew Blackwell
- Burn Gorman as Morgan
- Seth Numrich as Roy
- Rodney Roldan as Hispanic Man
- Maboud Ebrahimzadeh as Abdul
- Shawn Singletary as Tim, the wine shop owner

== Production ==
=== Development ===
Ragussis based his story on the experiences of FBI agent Michael German, who spent a year undercover with white supremacists. German wrote a book based upon his experience entitled Thinking Like a Terrorist: Insights of a Former FBI Undercover Agent, and after Ragussis read the book, he reached out to German for help creating Imperium. The two then came up with the movie's basic story.

On July 30, 2015, it was announced that Radcliffe had been cast in the lead role, portraying a young FBI Special Agent who goes undercover to find and stop white supremacists trying to make a dirty bomb. The film marks the feature-length directorial debut of Daniel Ragussis. Toni Collette, Sam Trammell, and Tracy Letts joined the cast of the film on October 8, 2015.

=== Filming ===
Principal photography began in late September 2015, with filming taking place in Richmond, Virginia and the nearby city of Hopewell. The first images of Radcliffe on the set, with a shaved head, were released on September 22, 2015.

== Release ==
In September 2015, it was reported that Signature Entertainment had pre-bought the rights to the film for the United Kingdom. Lionsgate Premiere acquired the United States domestic rights in early October 2015. The film was released in a limited theatrical release and through video on demand on August 19, 2016.

== Reception ==
=== Critical response ===
Imperium was generally well received. The review aggregator website Rotten Tomatoes gives the film an approval rating of 84%, based on 76 reviews, with an average rating of 6.50 out of 10. The site's critical consensus reads, "The unsettling Imperium boasts troublingly timely themes and a talented cast led by Daniel Radcliffe as an undercover FBI agent infiltrating a ring of white supremacists." On Metacritic, which assigns a normalized rating, the film has a score of 68 out of 100, based on 17 critics, indicating "generally favorable" reviews. The film was a New York Times Critics' Pick. The Los Angeles Times called it "impressively dimensional... tense, gripping and disturbing," Slant magazine called it "bold political cinema," and Entertainment Weekly said the film was "a tense, chilling thriller... Radcliffe is brilliant."

== See also ==
- American militia movement
- Neo-Nazism
- Radical right (United States)
- Racism in the United States
- White power skinhead
- White supremacist terrorism in the United States
