= Samuel Shaw (naval officer) =

Continental Navy officer

Samuel Shaw was a Revolutionary War naval officer who, along with Richard Marven, were among the first whistleblowers of the infant United States. As a whistleblower, Shaw was instrumental in the Continental Congress' passage of the first whistleblower protection law in the United States.

Shaw, a midshipman, and Marven, a third lieutenant in the Continental Navy, were moved to act after witnessing the mistreatment of British prisoners of war by Commodore Esek Hopkins, then Commander-in-Chief of the Continental Navy. Shaw and Marven were both from Rhode Island, as was Hopkins, whose brother was Stephen Hopkins, Governor of the new state, and a signatory to the Declaration of Independence. For reporting the misconduct of the Navy's highest officer, Shaw and Marven were both dismissed from the Navy. Hopkins then filed a criminal libel suit against Shaw and Marven in the Rhode Island Courts.

Appalled by the case, the Continental Congress then enacted a whistleblower protection law on July 30, 1778, by unanimous consent. The law declared it "the duty of all persons in the service of the United States, as well as all other inhabitants thereof, to give the earliest information to Congress or any other proper authority of any misconduct, frauds or misdemeanors committed by any officers or persons in the service of these states, which may come to their knowledge."

Congress then appropriated monies to represent and defend Shaw and Marven against the libel suit filed against Hopkins, resolving that, "reasonable expences [sic] of defending the said suit be defrayed by the United States," and ordered the termination of Hopkins' employment, as he "had misconducted himself."

On the second National Whistleblower Appreciation Day, Shaw was recognized as an unsung hero of American Whistleblowers. On July 30, 2015, Shaw was recognized at the First Congressional Celebration of National Whistleblower Appreciation Day, honored as one of two federal employees who created protections for those who stand for truth.

== See also ==
Whistleblower Protection Act of 1778
