= Đặng Thùy Trâm =

Surgeon in the Vietnam War

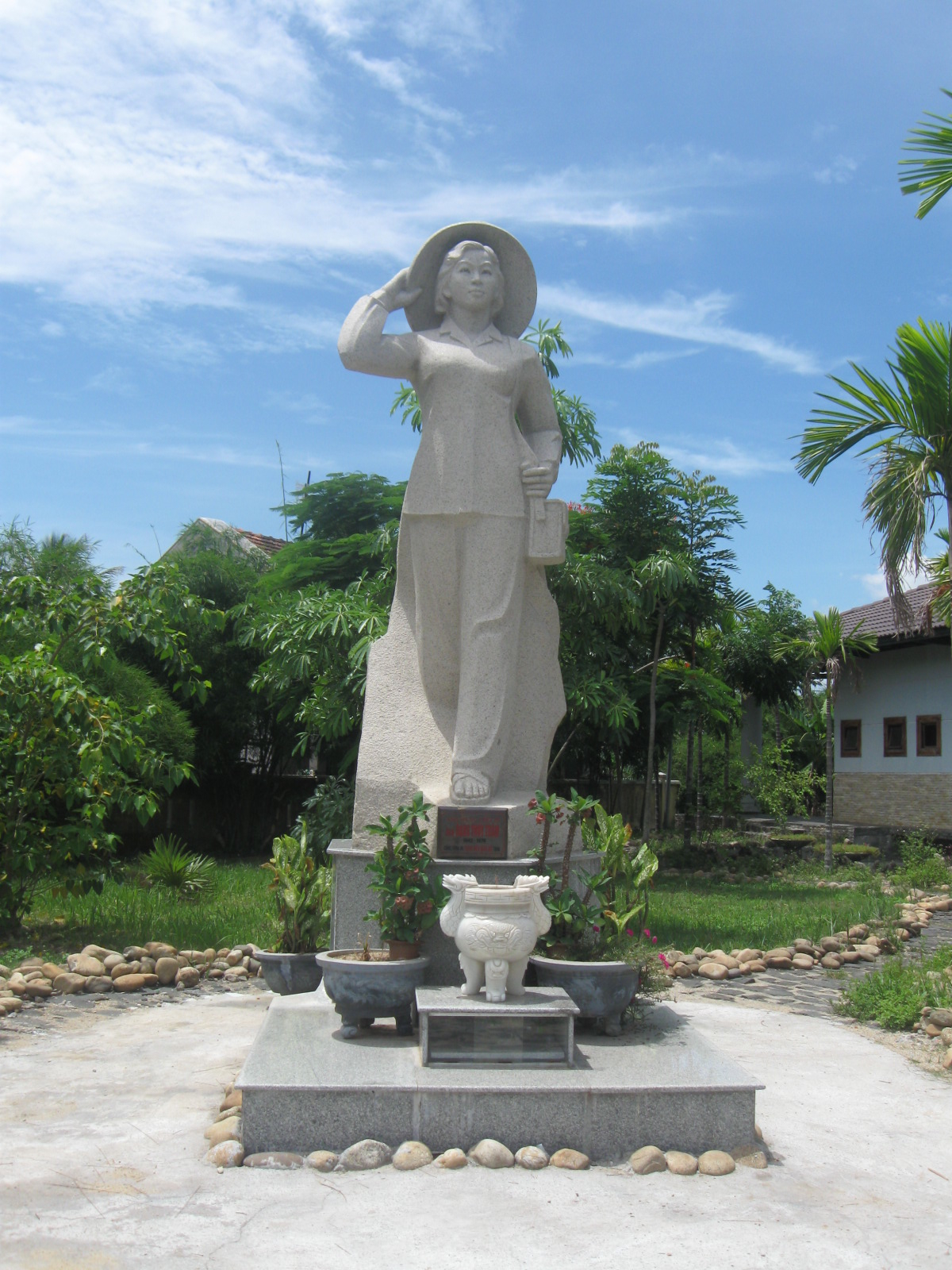
- Memorial statue to Đặng Thùy Trâm
- Born: November 26, 1942; Huế, Vietnam
- Died: June 22, 1970 (aged 27); Đức Phổ, Quảng Ngãi Province, Vietnam
- Education: Chu Văn An High School (Hanoi); Hanoi Medical University

Đặng Thùy Trâm (November 26, 1942 – June 22, 1970) was a Vietnamese doctor. She worked as a battlefield surgeon for the People's Army of Vietnam and Vietcong during the Vietnam War. Her wartime diaries, which chronicle the last two years of her life, attracted international attention following their publication in 2005.

== Early life ==
Trâm was born on November 26, 1942, in Huế and grew up in Hanoi, to a family of doctors that had spanned three generations. Her father, Đặng Ngọc Khuê, was a surgeon and her mother, Doãn Ngọc Trâm, was a pharmacist. Trâm was also the eldest of five siblings, which included three other younger sisters and a younger brother.

She went to high school at Chu Văn An High School (Hanoi) and later attended the Hanoi Medical University during college.

On December 23, 1966, Trâm, along with many other civilians, boarded a truck to the Quảng Bình Province and began working as a battlefield surgeon.

== Diaries ==
One of Trâm's handwritten diaries was captured by U.S. forces in December 1969. Following her death in a gun battle on June 22, 1970, a second diary was taken by Frederic Whitehurst, a then 22-year-old military intelligence specialist. Whitehurst defied an order to burn the diaries, instead following the advice of a South Vietnamese translator not to destroy them. He kept them for 35 years, with the intention of eventually returning them to Trâm's family.

After returning to the United States, Whitehurst's search for Trâm's family initially proved unsuccessful. After earning a Ph.D. in chemistry he joined the FBI, but was unable to reach anyone from the Vietnamese embassy. In March 2005, he and his brother Robert – another Vietnam veteran – brought the diaries to a conference at Texas Tech University. There, they met photographer Ted Engelmann (also a Vietnam veteran), who offered to look for the family during his trip to Vietnam. With the assistance of Do Xuan Anh, a staff member in the Hanoi Quaker office, Engelmann was able to locate Trâm's mother, Doãn Ngọc Trâm, and subsequently reached the rest of her family.

In July 2005, Trâm's diaries were published in Vietnam under the title Nhật ký Đặng Thùy Trâm (lit. 'Đặng Thùy Trâm's Diary'), which quickly became a bestseller. In less than a year, the volume sold more than 300,000 copies and comparisons were drawn between Trâm's writings and that of Anne Frank.

In August 2005, Fred and Robert Whitehurst traveled to Hanoi to meet Trâm's family. In October of that year, Trâm's family visited Lubbock, Texas, to view the diaries archived at Texas Tech University Vietnam Archive, and then visited Fred Whitehurst and his family.

The diaries were translated into English and published in September 2007. They include family photographs and images of Trâm. Translations of the diaries have been published in at least sixteen different languages.

In 2009, a film about Trâm by Vietnamese director Đặng Nhật Minh, entitled Đừng Đốt (Do Not Burn It), was released.

== Death ==
Trâm was 27 years old when she died on June 22, 1970, in Đức Phổ, Quảng Ngãi Province, Vietnam. She and another colleague were killed by a patrol from the US 4th Battalion, 21st Infantry Regiment, in a free-fire zone while traveling on a trail in the Ba Tơ jungle in Quảng Ngãi Province.
