= FBI Laboratory =

Forensic laboratory of the FBI in Virginia, US

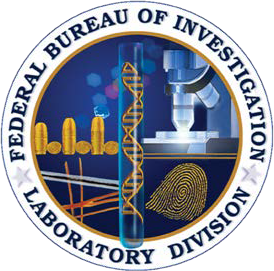
- Emblem of the FBI Laboratory Division
- Active: November 24, 1932 – present (93 years, 2 months)
- Country: United States
- Agency: Federal Bureau of Investigation
- Type: Forensic laboratory
- Part of: Science and Technology Branch
- Location: Marine Corps Base Quantico, Quantico, Virginia

Structure
- Employees: Approx. 500 (2007)
- Branches: Forensic Analysis; Operational Support

The FBI Laboratory (also called the Laboratory Division) is a division within the United States Federal Bureau of Investigation that provides forensic analysis support services to the FBI, as well as to state and local law enforcement agencies free of charge. The lab is located at Marine Corps Base Quantico in Quantico, Virginia. Opened November 24, 1932, the lab was first known as the Technical Laboratory. It became a separate division when the original Bureau of Investigation (BOI) was renamed the FBI.

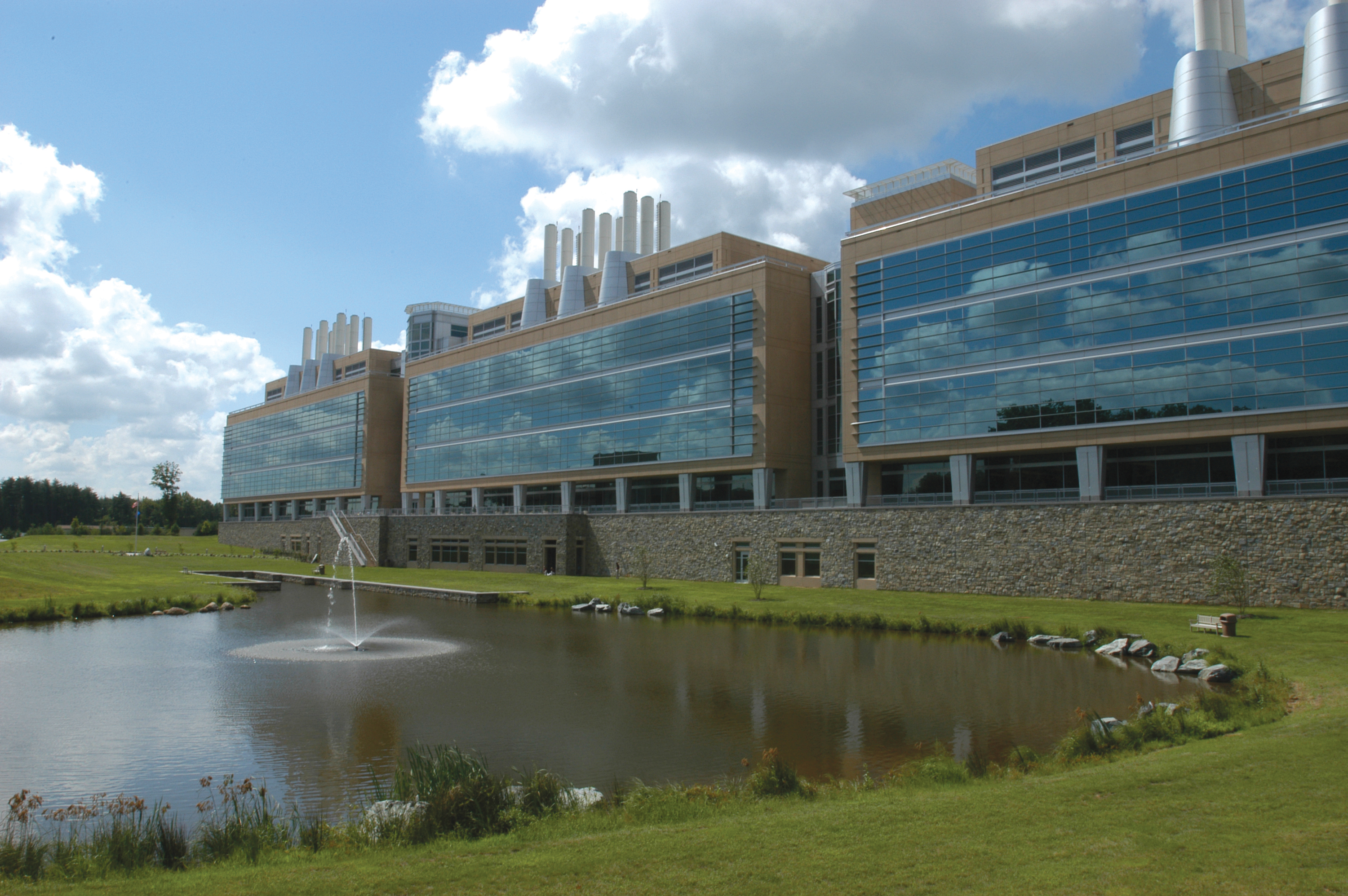
Laboratory building on the grounds of Marine Corps Base Quantico

The Lab staffs approximately 500 scientific experts and special agents. The lab generally enjoys the reputation as the premier crime lab in the United States. However, during the 1990s, its reputation and integrity came under withering criticism, primarily due to the revelations of Special Agent Dr. Frederic Whitehurst, the most prominent whistleblower in the history of the Bureau. Whitehurst was a harsh critic of conduct at the Lab. He believed that a lack of funding had affected operations and that Lab technicians had a pro-prosecution bias. He suggested they were FBI agents first and forensic scientists second, due to the institutional culture of the Bureau, which resulted in the tainting of evidence.

== History ==
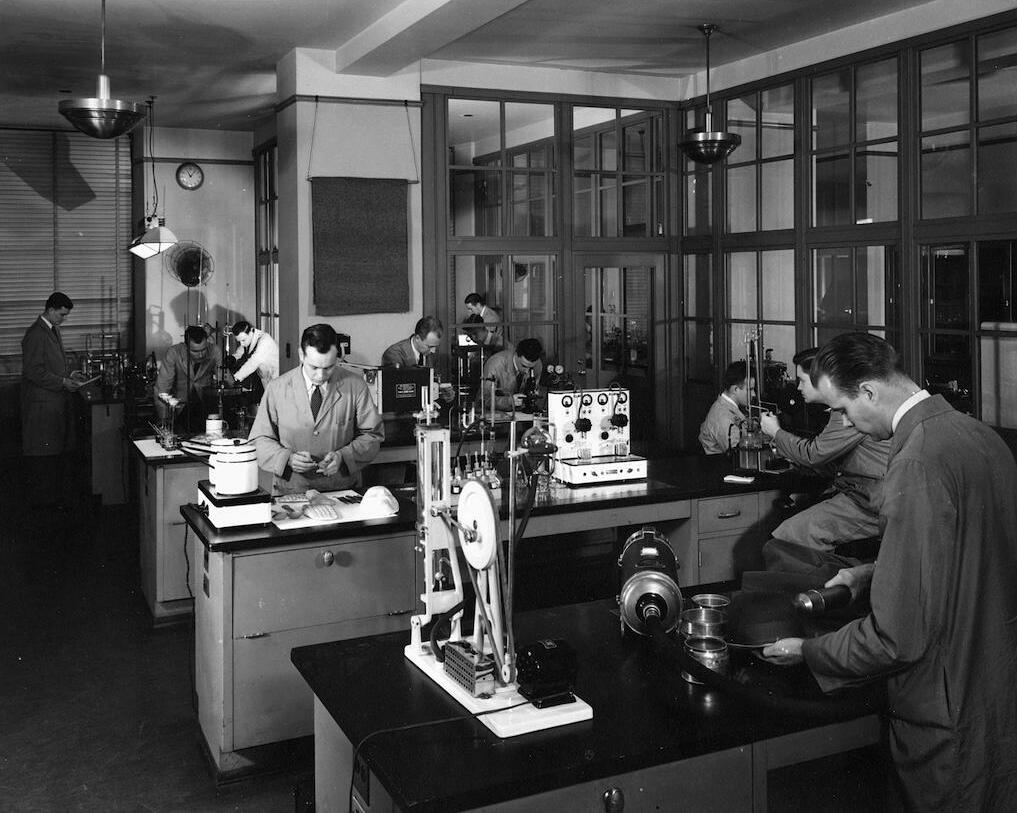
FBI crime lab in the 1940s

External videos
- Presentation by John F. Kelly on Tainting Evidence: Inside the Scandals at the FBI Crime Lab, July 10, 1998, C-SPAN

The FBI Laboratory was founded on November 24, 1932. Despite the budget limitations during the Great Depression, FBI director J. Edgar Hoover invested in major equipment upgrades including ultraviolet lamps, microscopes, moulage, and an extensive collection of tire treads, bullets, guns, and other materials that could assist local police in identifying crime scene evidence.

From September 1934 to September 1975, the Lab was located on the 6th floor and the attic of the Justice Department Building in Washington, D.C. Public tours of the lab work area were available until the FBI moved across the street to the newly constructed J. Edgar Hoover Building in 1974. Tours of the J. Edgar Hoover Building were available, but the tour route shifted away from the lab work space, thus sealing the lab from public view. The Lab expanded to such an extent that the Forensic Science Research and Training Center (FSRTC) was established at the FBI Academy in Quantico, Virginia. Methods at the FSRTC have helped establish standardized forensic practices for law enforcement agencies. The FBI Lab has been in Quantico since the relocation from Washington since April 2003.

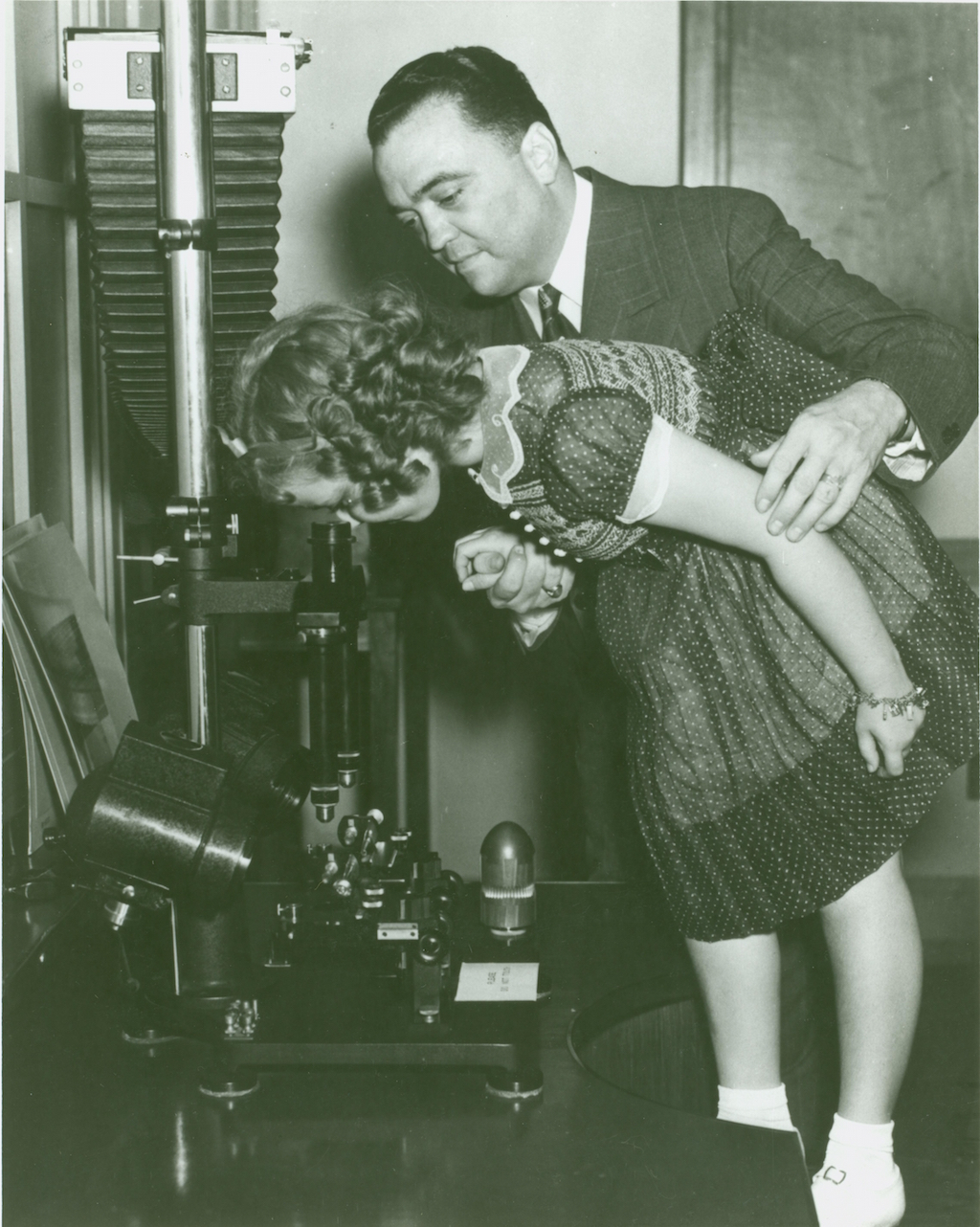
J. Edgar Hoover, then the FBI Director, showing actress Shirley Temple a microscope in the lab

=== Whistleblowing ===
Dr. Frederic Whitehurst, who joined the FBI in 1982 and served as a Supervisory Special Agent at the Lab from 1986 to 1998, blew the whistle on scientific misconduct at the Lab. As a result of Whitehurst's whistleblowing, the FBI Lab implemented forty major reforms, including undergoing an accreditation process. Reforms took place under FBI chief Louis Freeh, who served from 1993 to 2001.

Whitehurst's whistleblowing in the 1990s and the adverse publicity trials, in which FBI Lab employees were revealed as incompetent or disingenuous, led to major changes. According to John F. Kelly & Phillip K. Wearne's book Tainting Evidence: Inside the Scandals at the FBI Crime Lab (1998), the Lab had been hurt by a lack of funding and an institutional entropy rooted in Lab employees' belief that they were the best forensic experts in the country, if not the world. Some Lab employees failed to keep abreast of developments in forensic science.

The two authors concluded that the worst problem was that the Lab employees were FBI agents rather than pure forensic scientists. The investigative paradigm of the detective was antithetical to the investigative paradigm of the scientist. Lab employees began to work backwards, from a conclusion preordained by the prosecutors they served, and sought to justify that conclusion rather than using more scientific research methods.

== Projects ==
=== FBI Victims Identification Project ===
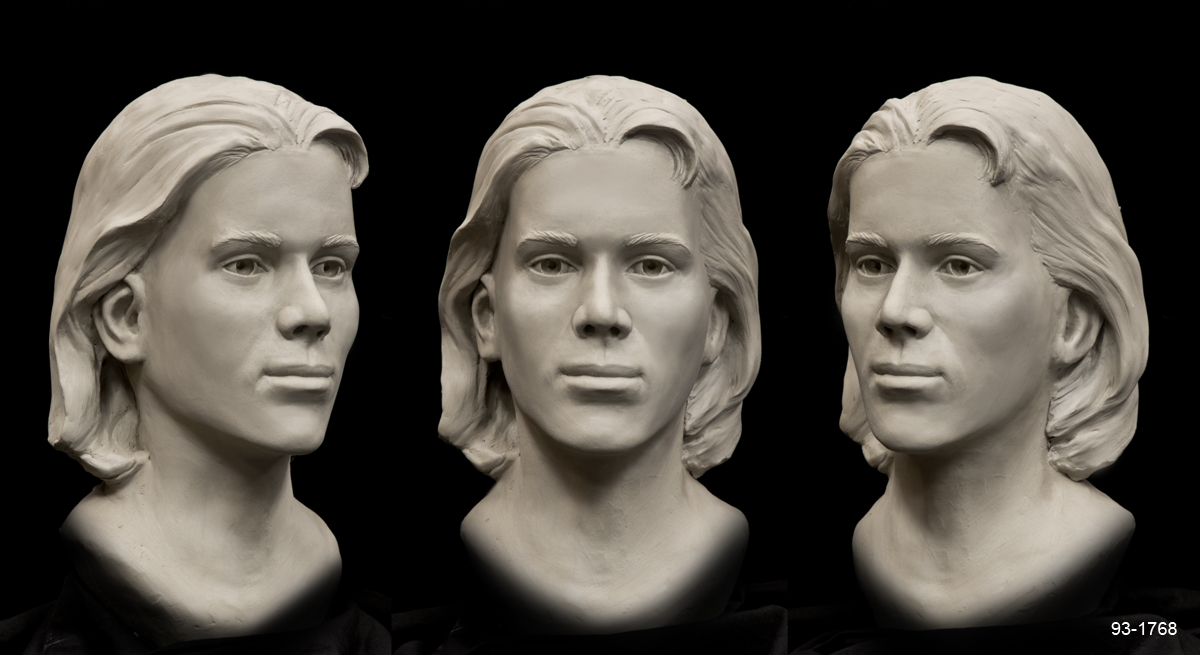
Example of a facial reconstruction by FBI Victims Identification Project, of the Elko County Jane Doe (murder victim, remains found in 1993)

The FBI Victims Identification Project (also known as VICTIMS) is an active research project within the FBI Laboratory to create a national database containing all available records of unidentified human remains. The goal of VICTIMS is to create a federally sponsored national database of unidentified remains. Currently there are many groups attempting to bring closure to an estimated 40,000 unidentified human remains cases in the United States, but VICTIMS is the first attempt to produce a comprehensive approach to the problem.

The VICTIMS project team includes FBI Laboratory personnel, personnel from the FBI Visiting Scientist Program, administered by Oak Ridge Institute for Science and Education, and contractors including Guiding Beacon Solutions. Guiding Beacon, a management and technology consulting firm from Pennsylvania, is providing the technology and data collection efforts for the project.

== 21st century controversies ==
The more widespread use of DNA testing in the late 20th century brought renewed scrutiny to the scientific reliability of many of the FBI Laboratory's forensic analyses. "Scientific experts consider DNA—which first became widely used in courts in the 1990s—to be the only near-certain indicator of a forensic match."

=== Hair analysis ===
The scientific reliability of FBI hair analysis has been questioned as DNA testing has exonerated persons convicted where the only physical evidence was hair analysis. In addition, in a high percentage of cases, the FBI has learned that its expert witnesses overstated the reliability of hair analysis in testimony in court cases. In 2013 the Department of Justice began a review of thousands of cases from 1982 through 1999 referred to the FBI for hair analysis. By 2015 it found that these included 32 death penalty convictions, of which 14 people had died in prison or been executed, and narrowed its review to cases that went to court. It has focused on cases in which hair analysis played a part in convictions, in order to follow up with defendants.

In a subsequent investigation in 2012, the DOJ found that evidence related to hair analysis had been falsified, altered, or suppressed, or that FBI agents had overstated the scientific basis of their testimony, to the detriment of defendants. In 2013, the Department of Justice began a review of cases referred to them for hair analysis from 1982 through 1999, as many as 10,000 cases, to determine whether their agents' testimony resulted in wrongful convictions. DNA testing has revealed some convicted inmates to be innocent of violent crime charges against them. In 2015 the FBI reported that their expert witnesses overstated the reliability of hair analysis in matching suspects 96 percent of the time, likely influencing conviction of some defendants.

Cases are still being overturned as a result of incorrect hair analysis testimony. In 2012, DNA testing revealed the innocence of three inmates from the District of Columbia who had been convicted to life and served years in prison based on hair analysis evidence and testimony by FBI experts. They have received large settlements from the city because of wrongful convictions and damages of the lost years.

=== Bullet and gun analysis ===
Bullet and gun analysis is another forensic discipline that has been identified in recent studies as being less scientifically reliable than thought. The Bureau established an interdisciplinary commission in 2013 to establish the highest scientific standards in forensic testing and to understand the limits of these tests, and how they may be properly used in court.

With a heightened attention to scientific rigor in its forensic testing, the FBI lab in 2005 abandoned its four-decade-long practice of tracing bullets to a specific manufacturer's batch through chemical analysis, after its methods were scientifically debunked. A blue-ribbon panel of the National Academy of Sciences raised concerns about the FBI's reliance on forensic testing in a 2009 report that "found nearly every familiar staple of forensic science to be scientifically unsound" and highly subjective.

=== Bite-mark analysis ===
In 2016 a man was exonerated and freed in Virginia, based on DNA evidence, after serving 33 years in prison. He had been convicted of rape and murder and sentenced to life in part based on several FBI experts testifying to identification of him by bite-mark patterns, to a "medical certainty".
