= Revenue Ruling 74-77 =

Revenue Ruling 74-77 is the 1974 income tax ruling by the Internal Revenue Service (IRS) determining that a taxpayer may exclude from gross income "damages for alienation of affections" and for the "surrender of the custody of minor child".

== Sol. Op. 132 ==
The ruling superseded Sol. Op. 132, I-1 C.B. 92 (1922), "since the position stated therein is set forth under the current statute and regulations in this Revenue Ruling", referring to 26 U.S.C. § 104 and 26 C.F.R. § 1.104-1.

That case excluded from gross income the amounts received by the taxpayer "as damages for alienation of affections or for the surrender of the custody of his child, whether under agreement of the parties or pursuant to judgment of the court."

In that case, an individual taxpayer received certain amounts in settlement of his suit for damages on account of alienation of affections and in consideration for the surrender of the custody of his minor child. These items relate to personal or family rights, not property rights, and may be treated together. None of the amounts received constituted exemplary or punitive damages.

== Aftermath ==
Rev. Rul. 74-77 was then, in turn, declared obsolete in Rev. Rul. 98–37, 1998-2 C.B. 133, because "the applicable statutory provisions or regulations [i.e., § 104(a)(2)] have been changed or repealed."

== See also ==
- Murphy v. IRS
