= Howard Wilkinson (whistleblower) =

British whistleblower (born 1971)

Howard Stephen Jeremy Wilkinson (born 3 April 1971) is a British whistleblower whose actions helped to illuminate the 2018 Danske Bank money laundering scandal. Wilkinson's disclosure was part of reporting that was published in 2018 that stated from 2007 to 2014, a Danske Bank branch located in Estonia had been involved in the suspected laundering of up to $235 billion U.S. dollars.

== Danske Bank disclosure ==
While working at an Estonian Danske Bank branch, Wilkinson brought attention to a suspected breach of anti-money laundering procedures in the branch by writing four reports to the internal audit unit and management of the bank in Copenhagen in 2013 and 2014. The bank did not respond to these allegations until 2018, when Wilkinson's name was released by an anonymous source to the Estonian newspaper Eesti Ekspress without his consent, which according to Wilkinson, violated his whistleblower protection rights.

In November 2018, Wilkinson appeared before the European Parliament Special Committee on Financial Crimes, Tax Evasion and Tax Avoidance to give a testimony on the Danske Bank case. In December 2018, Wilkinson testified in front of the Danish Parliament regarding his involvement as a whistleblower. In May 2019 Wilkinson's case was featured on the CBS 60 Minutes television program.
