= Michael German =

Agent of the Federal Bureau of Investigation

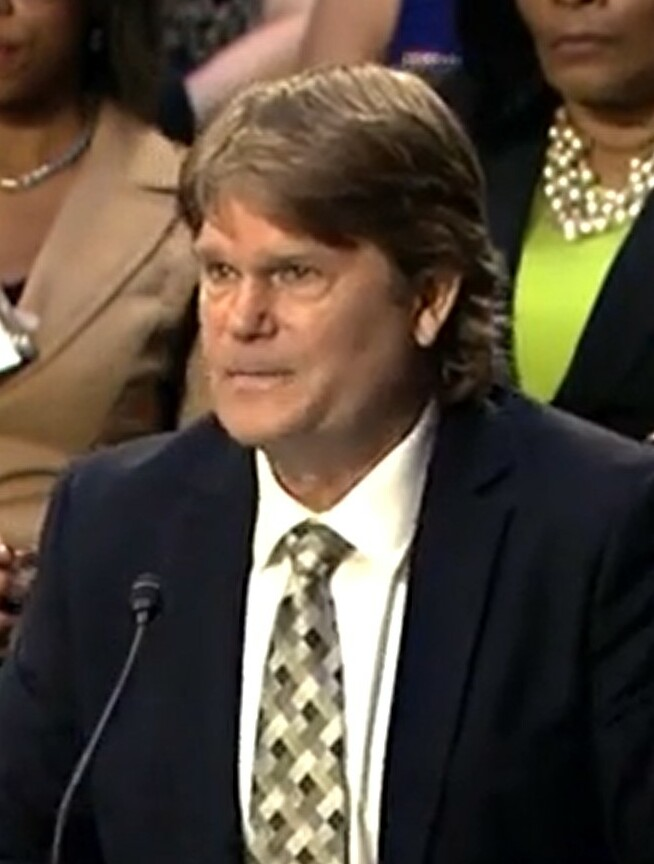
- German in 2022
- Occupation(s): FBI agent Security consultant Writer

Michael German is a retired American FBI agent, scholar, and writer. He is a fellow in the Brennan Center for Justice's Liberty and National Security program.

== Life ==
During his 16-year career as a Special Agent in the FBI, German spent many months undercover, first among white supremacists and then among right-wing militants. German left the FBI in 2004 as a whistleblower, alleging misconduct and mismanagement in counterterrorism cases. German reported this mismanagement to Congress.

His 2008 book, Thinking Like a Terrorist: Insights of a Former FBI Undercover Agent, was about his experiences as a special agent. He spent seven years as a Senior Policy Counsel at the ACLU’s Washington Legislative Office, working on issues relating to national security policies and civil rights. German joined writer and director Daniel Ragussis in creating the screenplay for Imperium, starring Daniel Radcliffe as an undercover FBI Special Agent under an FBI case agent played by Toni Collette.

His work has appeared in the Guardian, Time, The Cipher Brief, and Defence One.

== Works ==
- Thinking Like a Terrorist: Insights of a Former FBI Undercover Agent, University of Nebraska Press, 2008. ISBN 9781597970266
- Disrupt, Discredit, and Divide: How the New FBI Damages Democracy, The New Press, 2019. ISBN 9781620973790
