= Marsha Coleman-Adebayo =

American whistleblower

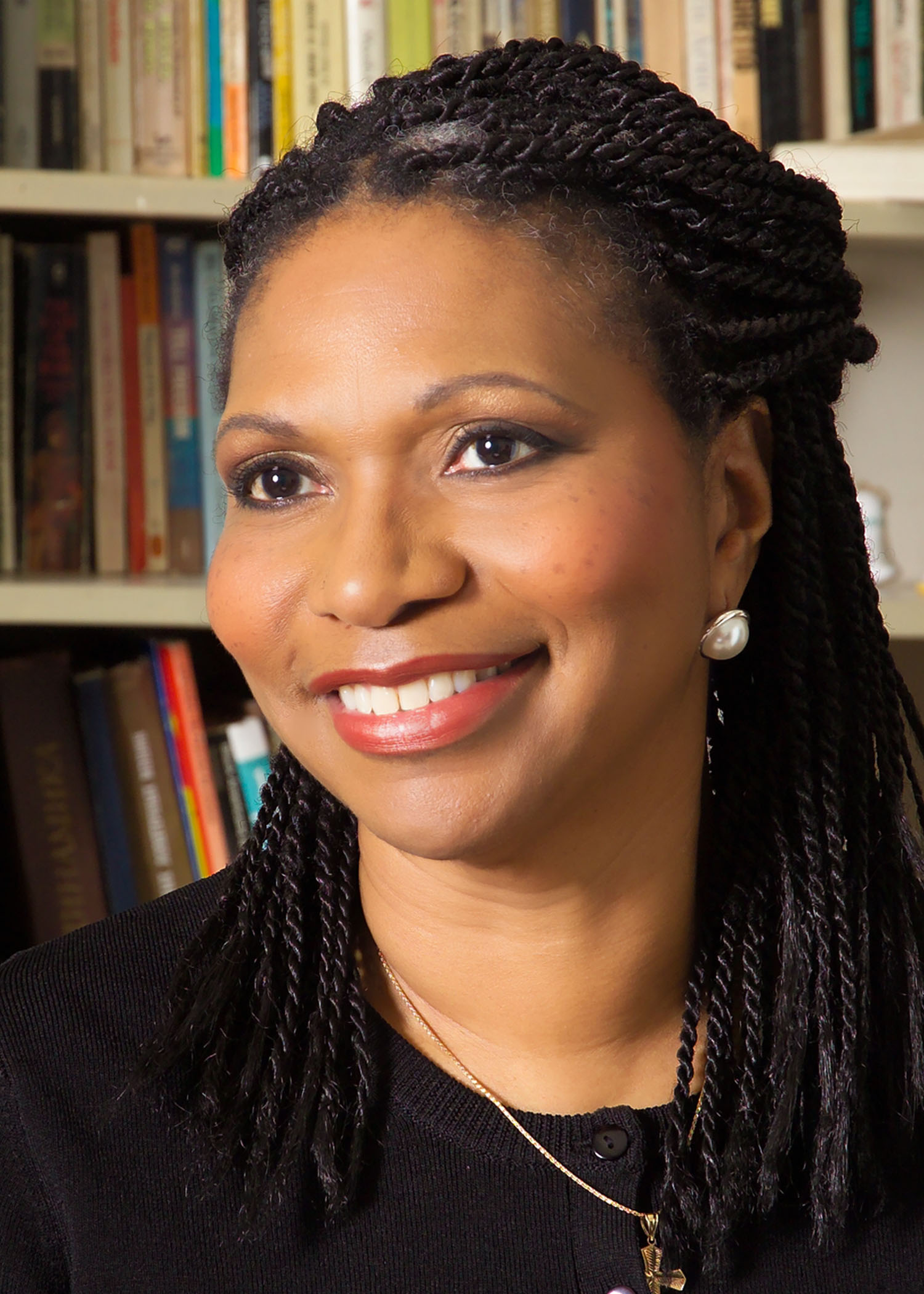
Marsha Coleman-Adebayo

Marsha Coleman-Adebayo (born August 18, 1952) is an American former senior policy analyst for the United States Environmental Protection Agency (EPA). Beginning in 1996, she filed complaints alleging that a company from the United States was mining vanadium in South Africa and harming the environment and human health. The EPA did not respond, and Coleman-Adebayo reported her concerns to other organizations. When the EPA subsequently did not promote Coleman-Adebayo at her request, she filed suit against the agency, alleging racial and gender discrimination. On August 18, 2000, a federal jury found EPA guilty of violating the civil rights of Coleman-Adebayo on the basis of race, sex, color and a hostile work environment, under the Civil Rights Act of 1964. Her experience inspired passage of the Notification and Federal Employee Anti-discrimination and Retaliation Act of 2002 (No FEAR Act).

During the legal proceedings, Coleman-Adebayo remained employed at the EPA. When she was diagnosed with hypertension, the agency agreed to let her remote work. After five years and another lawsuit, the EPA ordered Coleman-Adebayo to return to the office, placing her on unpaid leave when she did not comply.

Coleman-Adebayo is a founder and leader of the No FEAR Coalition and EPA Employees Against Racial Discrimination. Through her leadership the No FEAR Coalition, working closely with Representative James Sensenbrenner, organized a successful grass-roots campaign and secured passage of the "Notification of Federal Employees Anti-discrimination and Retaliation Act," the first Civil Rights Law of the 21st Century. The Act was signed into law by President George W. Bush in 2002.
