= No-FEAR Act =

U.S. Federal anti-discrimination law

- Other short titles: Notification and Federal Employee Antidiscrimination and Retaliation Act of 2001
- Long title: An Act to require that Federal agencies be accountable for violations of antidiscrimination and whistleblower protection laws, and for other purposes.
- Nicknames: Notification and Federal Employee Antidiscrimination and Retaliation Act of 2002
- Enacted by: the 107th United States Congress
- Effective: May 15, 2002

Citations
- Public law: 107-174
- Statutes at Large: 116 Stat. 566

Codification
- Acts amended: Civil Rights Act of 1964
- Titles amended: 5 U.S.C.: Government Organization and Employees
- U.S.C. sections amended: 5 U.S.C. ch. 23 § 2301 et seq.

Legislative history
- Introduced in the House as H.R. 169 by James Sensenbrenner Jr. (R–WI) on January 3, 2001; Committee consideration by House Government Reform, House Energy and Commerce, House Transportation and Infrastructure, House Judiciary, Senate Governmental Affairs; Passed the House on October 2, 2001 (420-0, Roll call vote 360, via Clerk.House.gov); Passed the Senate on April 23, 2002 (passed unanimous consent) with amendment; House agreed to Senate amendment on April 30, 2002 (412-0, Roll call vote 117, via Clerk.House.gov); Signed into law by President George W. Bush on May 15, 2002

The Notification and Federal Employee Antidiscrimination and Retaliation Act of 2002 is a United States federal law that seeks to discourage federal managers and supervisors from engaging in unlawful discrimination and retaliation. It is popularly called the No-FEAR Act, and is also known as Public Law 107–174.

== Enactment ==
On August 18, 2000, a federal jury found the US Environmental Protection Agency (EPA) guilty of violating the civil rights of Dr. Marsha Coleman-Adebayo on the basis of race, sex, color and a hostile work environment, under the Civil Rights Act of 1964. She was awarded $600,000. The EPA had refused to promote Coleman-Adebayo shortly after she alleged the presence of environmental and health problems at the Brits, South Africa, vanadium mines.

Sparked by this outcome, Congressman F. James Sensenbrenner, Chairman of the House Judiciary Committee and Texas Congresswoman Sheila Jackson-Lee introduced the No-FEAR Act into Congress. Dr. Coleman-Adebayo founded the No FEAR Institute to organize support for the bill's purposes while continuing to work for the EPA. The No FEAR Institute spearheaded the No FEAR Coalition to advocate for passage of the Act.

President George W. Bush signed it into law on May 15, 2002, making it the first United States civil rights law of the 21st century.

== Criticism ==
Marsha Coleman-Adebayo and others have criticized implementation of the No-FEAR Act on grounds that agencies are abusing the provision allowing them a "reasonable" time to make their reimbursements to the General Fund of the Treasury. They have proposed a No-FEAR II Act to set a time limit for such reimbursements, and to increase the penalties for violations.

== Book and movie ==
Coleman-Adebayo wrote a book about her experience which as of 2014 is in the process of being adapted into the movie The Marsha Coleman-Adebayo Story with producer and actor Danny Glover.

== See also ==
- Civil and political rights
- Civil Rights Movement
- Whistleblower
