= Bassem Youssef (FBI agent) =

Egyptian-American FBI senior agent

Bassem Youssef (born Egypt) is a senior Egyptian-American FBI agent. He was the highest ranking American agent of Middle Eastern and North African descent ever employed by the Federal Bureau of Investigation as of 2009, as a Unit Chief in the FBI Counterterrorism Division. Prior to holding this position, Youssef coordinated the national counterterrorism investigation into the Islamic Group, the organization responsible for the first World Trade Center bombing.

== Career ==
Youssef was born in Egypt to a Christian Orthodox family. He speaks fluent Arabic (the highest ranking FBI official with this skill). In 1994, he earned the Intelligence Community’s prestigious and coveted award, the National Intelligence Distinguished Service Medal, awarded by the Director of Central Intelligence (DCI). The award was for outstanding accomplishments in a terrorism case involving an al-Qaeda-related investigation.

After obtaining the DCI award, he was selected by the former FBI Director Louis Freeh to head of the FBI’s overseas office with responsibility for Saudi Arabia and the contiguous Gulf States, including UAE, Kuwait, Oman, Yemen, Bahrain and Qatar. The FBI’s internal inspection of that office, conducted in 2000, highly praised Youssef’s performance. Inspection reports are kept confidential within the FBI, and are tasked with identifying problems in various programs.

According to an FBI report drafted in 2000, within three months of his arrival in Saudi Arabia Youssef's "efforts led to the establishment of direct communications with senior officials of the Mabahith [Saudi Arabia's security service] which had previously been unavailable to US Embassy personnel." These contacts were crucial in establishing a first-ever meeting between then-FBI director Louis Freeh and Saudi officials.

== Whistleblower ==
In July, 2006 the Justice Department's Office of Professional Responsibility concluded that the FBI illegally retaliated against Youssef because he had allegedly made whistleblower disclosures to the Director of the FBI and a Member of Congress.
