= Richard Marven =

Richard Marven was a Revolutionary War naval officer who, along with Samuel Shaw, were instrumental figures in the passage of the first whistleblower protection law in the United States. The Continental Congress was moved to act after an incident in 1777, when Marven, a third lieutenant in the Continental Navy, and Shaw, a midshipman, were part of a group of sailors and marines who blew the whistle on Commodore Esek Hopkins, the commander-in-chief of the Continental Navy. The group accused Hopkins of mistreating British prisoners of war. Marven and Shaw were from Rhode Island, as was Hopkins, whose brother was governor of the new state and had been a signatory to the Declaration of Independence. After being dismissed from the Continental Navy, Commodore Hopkins filed a criminal libel suit against Marven and Shaw in the Rhode Island courts.

Spurred on by the case, the Continental Congress enacted a whistleblower protection law on July 30, 1778 by a unanimous vote. The law declared it the duty of "all persons in the service of the United States, as well as all other the inhabitants thereof" to inform the Continental Congress or proper authorities of "misconduct, frauds or misdemeanors committed by any officers in the service of these states, which may come to their knowledge." Congress declared that the United States would defend the two whistleblowers against a libel suit filed against them by Hopkins, resolving that "the reasonable expenses of defending the said suit be defrayed by the United States" and terminated the employment of Hopkins, who had misconducted himself."
