= Frederic Whitehurst =

American lawyer and chemist

Frederic "Fred" Whitehurst is an American chemist and attorney who served as a supervisory special agent in the Federal Bureau of Investigation Laboratory from 1986 to 1998. Concerned about problems he saw among agents, he went public as a whistleblower to bring attention to procedural errors and misconduct by agents. After the FBI retaliated against his claims, he began to attend law school at night and used his Juris Doctor degree to continue his fight. After ten years of refusal, the FBI investigated his claims and agreed to 40 reforms to improve the forensic reliability of its testing.

== Biography ==
=== Info ===
Frederic W. Whitehurst was born Nov, 1947 in Newport, Rhode Island. He currently lives in Bethel, North Carolina with his wife Cheryl.

=== Vietnam ===
Whitehurst served as an intelligence specialist at the Americal base in Đức Phổ, Vietnam, during the early 1970s. He was tasked with reviewing seized documents and destroying any that had no military value. Working with translator Sergeant Nguyen Trung Hieu and following his advice, he saved two diaries written by Dr. Đặng Thùy Trâm, a civilian woman doctor working for North Vietnam. He kept them for 35 years, with the intention of eventually returning them to Trâm's family, if possible.

=== FBI career ===
Dr. Whitehurst received a Ph.D. in chemistry from Duke University, and a J.D. from Georgetown University. He joined the FBI in 1982 and served as a supervisory special agent in the FBI crime lab from 1986 to 1998.

While he was employed by the Federal Bureau of Investigation Laboratory, the FBI officially rated Dr. Whitehurst as the leading national and international expert in the science of explosives and explosives residue. Concerned about a number of issues that he observed with old equipment, rusty gear, improper protocol, and by the behavior of agents in the laboratory, he began to investigate their procedures. He eventually uncovered and reported what he thought were cases of scientific misconduct, alleging that the agents were biased toward the prosecution.

In 1989, Whitehurst was brought in on an international trial in San Francisco and noticed that one of his colleagues had testified untruthfully. After notifying the court officials, the FBI's response was to reprimand him and give him time off.

After speaking to managers and even going so far as to call FBI director William S. Sessions and spend an hour expressing his concerns, the allegations were ignored and nothing was done.

Whitehurst began to attend law school at Georgetown University by taking his classes at night, earning his J.D. in 1996. During this period, to protect himself in administrative proceedings, Whitehurst hired Kohn, Kohn & Colapinto, a Washington, D.C. law firm specializing in defending whistleblowers. The attorney general attempted to stop Whitehurst from talking to counsel and threatened to prosecute him if he revealed anything outside of the FBI or DOJ.

When the FBI investigated his claims the Office of the Inspector General's (OIG) report of Whitehurst's allegations, it was concluded that, "Partly as a result of the sweeping accusations Whitehurst has made against others, it has become increasingly difficult for him to work with examiners in the EU and other units of the Laboratory. Moreover, Whitehurst appears to lack the judgment and common sense necessary for a forensic examiner, notwithstanding his own stated commitment to objective and valid scientific analysis". The FBI crime lab finally agreed to forty major reforms, including undergoing an accreditation process.

== Post-FBI years ==
Dr. Whitehurst currently serves as the Executive Director of the Forensic Justice Project (FJP). The FJP was formed in 1998 as a project of the National Whistleblower Center, a non-profit 501(c)3 organization. The goal of the FJP is to lead a national effort to accomplish the following:

- Review cases to make sure that innocent people have not been wrongfully convicted through the misuse of forensic science;
- Provide expert testimony in cases in order to assure that forensic science is not misused in civil and criminal prosecutions impacting on the public interest or the rights of individuals;
- Offer objective scientific evaluations of forensic evidence;
- Publish and distribute information necessary for an objective analysis of the quality and objectivity of forensic science and crime laboratories nationwide.

Dr. Whitehurst practices criminal law in Bethel, North Carolina. He was elected to the commission of the town of Bethel.

=== The Diaries ===
In March 2005, he and his brother Robert (also a Vietnam War veteran) brought the Đặng Thùy Trâm diaries to a conference on the Vietnam War at Texas Tech University. There, they met photographer Ted Engelmann (also a Vietnam veteran), who offered to look for the family during his trip to Vietnam the next month. With the assistance of Đỗ Xuân Anh, a staff member in the Hanoi Quaker office, Engelmann was able to locate Trâm's mother, Doãn Ngọc Trâm. He obtained connections to the rest of her family.

In July 2005, Trâm's diaries were published in Vietnamese under the title Nhật ký Đặng Thùy Trâm (Đặng Thùy Trâm's Diary), which quickly became a bestseller. In less than a year, the volume sold more than 300,000 copies, and comparisons were drawn between Trâm's writings and that of Anne Frank.

In August 2005, Fred and Robert Whitehurst traveled to Hanoi, Vietnam, to meet Trâm's family. In October of the same year, the Vietnamese family came to Lubbock, Texas, to view the diaries, which are archived at Texas Tech University's Vietnam Archive. They also visited Fred Whitehurst and his family in his home state of North Carolina.

The diaries have been translated into English and were published in September 2007. The book includes photographs of Đặng during high school and with her family. Additional translations have been made and the book has been published in at least sixteen different languages.

In 2009 a film about Đặng Thùy Trâm by Vietnamese director Đặng Nhật Minh, entitled Đừng Đốt (Do Not Burn It), was released.

== Legacy ==
During his military service in Vietnam, Whitehurst saved Dr. Đặng Thùy Trâm's diaries, which were first published in 2005 and are the basis for the 2009 film Đừng Đốt (Do Not Burn It). In addition, as noted above, he investigated, uncovered and reported scientific misconduct which forced the FBI crime lab to agree to forty major reforms, including undergoing an accreditation process.

The following is a list of investigations that Whitehurst was personally involved in:

- 1993 World Trade Center bombing
- Oklahoma City bombing
- O. J. Simpson
- Pan Am Flight 103
- The Y2K Bomber
- Assassination attempt against George Bush
- Boston Marathon
- Shoe bomber
- Investigation of the FBI crime laboratory
