= Jane Turner (FBI whistleblower) =

American FBI whistleblower

Jane Turner is an American Federal Bureau of Investigation (FBI) whistleblower.

In 1999, Turner brought to the attention of her management team serious misconduct concerning failures to investigate and prosecute crimes against children in Indian country and in the Minot, North Dakota community. Turner also reported on misconduct related to the potential criminal theft of property from the 9/11 Ground Zero crime scene in New York City by Minneapolis FBI personnel.

In January 2007 a Minneapolis jury awarded Turner $500,000 (capped by law at $360,000) for retaliation and backpay for the agency's actions following her filing of a sexual discrimination claim.

In January 2008, the U.S. Government was ordered to pay $1 million in legal fees to Turner's lawyers.

In January 2015, the U.S. Government Accountability Office (GAO) conducted a study on the United States Department of Justice response to FBI whistleblower retaliation and cited Turner's case in their report. On March 4, 2015, the Senate held a hearing on about whistleblower retaliation at the FBI, in which Turner's case was featured.
