= Presidential Policy Directive 19 =

The United States Presidential Policy Directive 19, signed by President Barack Obama, is designed to ensure that employees who serve in the Intelligence Community or have access to classified information can effectively report waste, fraud, and abuse, while protecting classified information. It is the executive order establishing standards for all Federal agencies with employees covered by the Directive, including those under Defense Intelligence Community Whistleblower Protection and the U.S. Department of Defense Whistleblower Program. It also prohibits retaliation against these employees for their reports. PPD-19 accordingly establishes a system of Intelligence Community whistleblowing and source protection under the Office, director of national intelligence and supervised by the Inspector General of the Intelligence Community (IC IG).

National security directives are used by the Executive Branch, specifically the White House, to disseminate presidential decisions on matters of national security. The Obama Administration called them Presidential Policy Directives or PPDs.

== Goals ==
PPD-19, as written, states that it:

- Prohibits retaliation against any officer or employee of a covered agency within the Intelligence Community.
- Prohibits retaliation by affecting eligibility for access to classified information.
- Allows for employees who allege reprisal to request an external review by a three-member Inspector General panel if the applicable review process is exhausted. However, the Panel can only make recommendations back to the head of the agency and cannot require agencies to correct retaliation.

PPD-19 did not originally protect national security contractors like Edward Snowden from any form of reprisal except decisions connected to their security clearance. According to whistle-blower lawyer Mark Zaid, excluding contractors was "a remarkable and obviously intentional oversight, given the significant number of contractors who now work within the intelligence community." The procedures for this directive did not go into effect until July 2013, after Edward Snowden made his disclosures. Protections for intelligence community contractors were codified within the Foreign Intelligence Surveillance Act Reauthorization Act of 2018.

Parts of PPD-19 were codified into law in the Intelligence Authorization Act for Fiscal Year 2014.
