= John Crane (government official) =

American whistleblower

John R. Crane
- Education: Northwestern University; Georgetown University
- Occupations: Pentagon executive, consultant
- Employer(s): U.S. Congress; Defense Dept Inspector General; Government Accountability Project
- Known for: Support for government whistleblowers
- Relatives: Günther Rüdel (grandfather)
- Awards: Joe A. Callaway Award for Civic Courage

John Crane is a former Assistant Inspector General of the U.S. Department of Defense known for his advocacy on behalf of government whistleblowers. He was fired in 2013 and now works for the Government Accountability Project, a non-governmental whistleblower support organization.

== Career ==
Crane graduated from Northwestern University with a bachelor's degree in Asian studies in 1980. He then studied at the Arabic Language Unit of the American University in Cairo from 1980 to 1982.

Crane worked as press secretary for Republican Congressman Bill Dickinson, ranking member on the House Armed Services Committee, from 1985 to 1987. Dickinson advocated establishing an Office of the Inspector General in the Defense Department. When that office was created in 1982, Crane became one of its first employees, helping to set up the hotlines for whistleblowers to report waste, fraud, or abuse. He had the text of the Whistleblower Protection Act of 1989 printed up as pamphlets for the personnel in the IG's office to refer to in carrying out their responsibilities. Crane's work also included crafting committee press releases involving analysis of the National Defense Authorization Act and consequences for national defense policy.

In 1987, Crane became Legislative Director and Press Secretary for Silicon Valley Congressman Ernie Konnyu, where he did supervisory work on formulating legislative policy agenda and communications thereof.

By 1988, Crane moved to the Defense Department's Inspector General office as a Congressional Liaison. He represented the IG on congressional activities and legislation as well as in contacts on legislative and public affairs with the Office of the Secretary of Defense. In 1994 Crane was promoted to Director of the Office of Communication in the IG. He managed public affairs efforts including public statements and congressional testimonies regarding US activities in Southwest Asia. He was promoted to a high-level executive position, the Assistant Inspector General for Communications, in 2004. He administered change management and communication policy for Europe, Southwest Asia, and East Asia. He also performed strategic planning and was Principal Advisor to the IG. He was responsible for whistleblowing and transparency, including strategic (internal) and public affairs communications that included responses regarding the Freedom of Information (FOIA) and Privacy Acts. Crane reviewed legislation and advised on legislative changes. He was fired from his post as an assistant inspector general in February 2013, an action he claims came in response to his advocacy on behalf of whistleblowers who faced illegal reprisal from his superiors in the IG and from other areas of the executive branch.

In October 2013, Crane joined the Government Accountability Project (GAP) as a consultant on legislative impact analysis. At GAP, he works with whistleblowers related to national security and on legislative, FOIA, and Privacy Act impacts.

Crane earned an Executive Master's in leadership from Georgetown University in 2015.

=== Whistleblower program official becomes whistleblower ===
Edward Snowden went to the press with revelations about the NSA due to the experience of previous whistleblowers, such as Thomas Andrews Drake, William Binney, J. Kirk Wiebe, Ed Loomis, and Diane Roark, who initially reported their concerns within the system and faced intense retaliation.

After making his concerns about mistreatment of whistleblowers known to his superiors, Crane was removed from his position in 2013. He was a recipient of the 2015 Joe A. Callaway Award for Civic Courage. He is a major focus of investigative journalist Mark Hertsgaard's book, Bravehearts: Whistle-blowing in the Age of Snowden.

== See also ==
- Whistleblower protection in the United States
  - Defense Intelligence Community Whistleblower Protection
- List of whistleblowers
  - Global surveillance whistleblowers
  - Thomas Tamm
  - Russ Tice
