= Defense Criminal Investigative Service =

Service of the U.S. Department of Defense

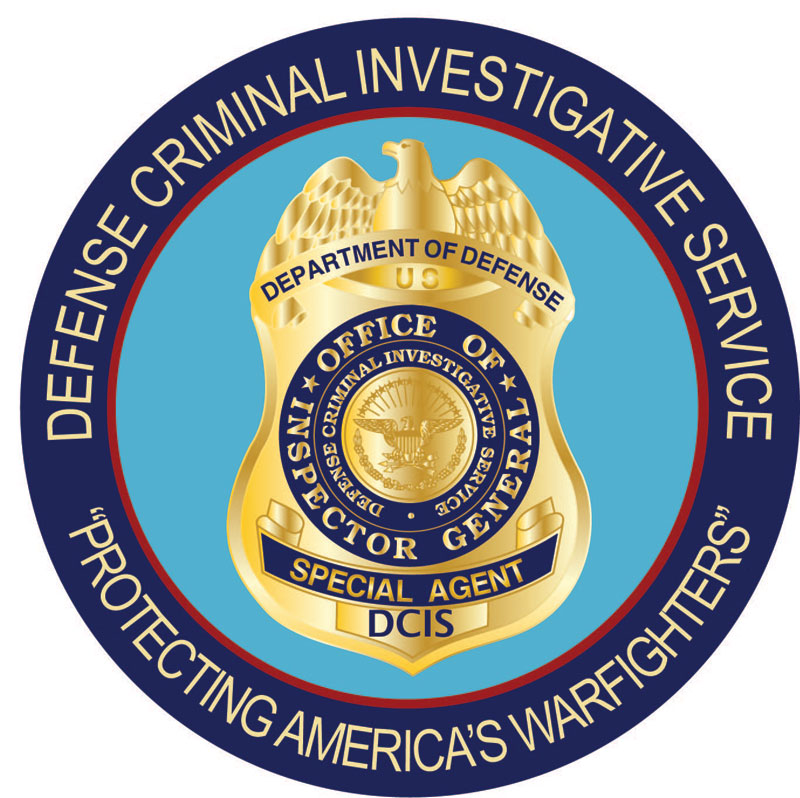
- Seal of DCIS
- Abbreviation: DCIS

Agency overview
- Formed: 1981

Jurisdictional structure
- Federal agency: United States
- Operations jurisdiction: United States
- General nature: Federal law enforcement

Operational structure
- Headquarters: Mark Center Building, Alexandria, Virginia, United States
- Agency executives: James R. Ives, Deputy Inspector General for Investigations / DCIS Director; Jason M. Suffredini, Principal Deputy Director; Grant Fleming, Deputy Director, Investigative Operations; Gregory Shilling, Deputy Director, Internal Operations
- Parent agency: Office of the Inspector General, U.S. Department of Defense

Website
- www.dodig.mil/Components/DCIS/

The Defense Criminal Investigative Service (DCIS) is the criminal investigation arm of the United States Department of Defense Office of Inspector General.

== Mission statement ==
The Defense Criminal Investigative Service (DCIS) investigates criminal activity that endangers military personnel, threatens national security, undermines military readiness, and diverts vital resources from the Department of Defense's core mission.

== Background ==
On April 20, 1981, Secretary of Defense Caspar Weinberger established the Defense Criminal Investigative Service (DCIS) as a worldwide civilian federal law enforcement agency responsible for investigating suspected criminal activities involving Department of Defense (DoD) components and DoD contractors.

When DCIS was created, the criminal investigative functions previously assigned to the Defense Investigative Service were transferred, along with 100 personnel billets, to the Office of the Assistant to the Secretary of Defense (Review and Oversight).

In October 1981, an initial cadre of 12 individuals from the DIS Special Investigations Unit began operating as DCIS special agents under the direction, authority, and control of the Assistant to the Secretary of Defense (Review and Oversight).

DCIS was incorporated into the Department of Defense Office of Inspector General when the office was established in 1982.

In 1997, DCIS became one of the first Offices of Inspector General investigative components to be granted permanent statutory law enforcement authorities comparable to those possessed by the FBI. Following the passage of Public Law 105–85 (Division A, Title X, §1071(a)), DCIS special agents were granted authority to carry concealed firearms, make arrests with or without warrants, and execute search warrants.

== Responsibilities ==
It is the obligation of the DoD Inspector General to "initiate, conduct, and supervise such investigations in the Department of Defense (including the military departments) as the Inspector General considers appropriate" (IG Act Sec. 8(c)(2)) and to "provide leadership and coordination and recommend policies for activities to prevent and detect fraud and abuse in DoD programs and operations" (IG Act Sec. 2(2)).

DCIS protects military personnel by investigating cases of fraud, bribery, and corruption; preventing the illegal transfer of sensitive defense technologies to prohibited nations and criminal organizations; investigating companies that supply defective, substandard, or counterfeit parts used in weapon systems and military equipment; and combating cybercrime and computer intrusions. Current investigative priorities include procurement and acquisition fraud, healthcare fraud, cybersecurity, and national security investigations.

== Organization ==
DCIS is led by the Deputy Inspector General for Investigations, who is cross-designated as the Director of DCIS.

The Principal Deputy Director of DCIS reports directly to the Director and serves as the organization's second-in-command.

DCIS Headquarters is organized into two functional branches:

- Investigative Operations
- Internal Operations

Each branch is managed by an Assistant Inspector General who is cross-designated as a Deputy Director of DCIS.

== Locations ==
DCIS is headquartered in Alexandria, Virginia, and maintains a presence in more than 50 domestic and international locations.

Each field office is overseen by a Special Agent in Charge (SAC), who supervises numerous subordinate resident agencies and duty posts throughout the United States.

Field office	City	State
Mid-Atlantic Field Office	Alexandria	Virginia
Cyber Field Office	Alexandria	Virginia
Transnational Operations Field Office	Alexandria	Virginia
Northeast Field Office	Boston	Massachusetts
Southeast Field Office	Atlanta	Georgia
Southwest Field Office	Dallas	Texas
Western Field Office	Mission Viejo	California

DCIS also maintains an international presence at the following locations:

Presence	City	Country
Camp Arifjan	Kuwait City	Kuwait
Naval Support Activity Bahrain	Mina Salman	Bahrain
Clay Kaserne	Wiesbaden	Germany
Al Udeid Air Base	Doha	Qatar
Camp Humphreys	Pyeongtaek	South Korea
U.S. Embassy Kyiv	Kyiv	Ukraine
Yokosuka Navy Base	Yokosuka	Japan

== Special agents ==
Pursuant to 10 U.S.C. § 1585, DCIS special agents conducting, supervising, or coordinating investigations of criminal activity in programs and operations of the Department of Defense are authorized to execute and serve warrants or other legal process issued under the authority of the United States; make arrests without a warrant for offenses committed in their presence; and make warrantless arrests for felonies under United States law when there is probable cause to believe that the individual has committed or is committing the offense.

Pursuant to 10 U.S.C. § 714, DCIS special agents are authorized to provide physical protection and personal security to certain DoD senior officials and other officials the Secretary of Defense determines require protection.

Authorization for DCIS special agents to carry firearms while performing investigative duties or other duties prescribed by the Secretary of Defense is provided under 10 U.S.C. § 1585(a).

=== Selection and training ===
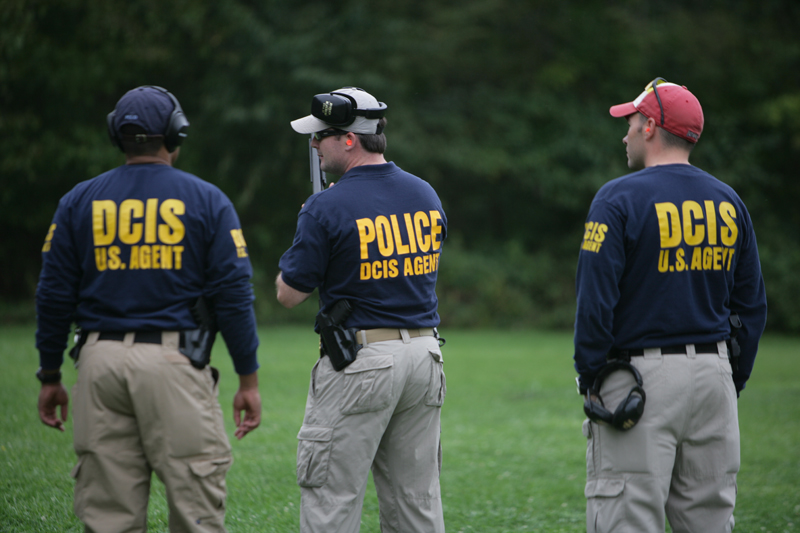
DCIS special agents participate in firearms training at FLETC.

To be considered for a DCIS special agent position, applicants must be United States citizens between the ages of 21 and 37, pass screening and background investigations, and demonstrate strong communication skills.

DCIS special agent candidates receive initial training at the Federal Law Enforcement Training Center (FLETC) in Glynco, Georgia. Candidates attend the 12-week Criminal Investigator Training Program (CITP) alongside trainees from agencies including Homeland Security Investigations, the United States Secret Service, and the Diplomatic Security Service.

Following completion of CITP, candidates attend an additional three-week training course specific to DCIS. Special agents may later return to FLETC for specialized instruction in areas such as counterproliferation, procurement fraud, money laundering, cybercrime investigations, and advanced interview techniques.

== In popular culture ==
- In the 2010 film The A-Team, the character Charissa Sosa is portrayed as a captain in DCIS. In reality, DCIS special agents are civilian federal law enforcement personnel rather than military service members.
- In NCIS season 20, episode 6, DCIS investigates a suspected mole within NCIS, with Kasie Hines serving as a lead investigator for the agency.
- In episodes 5 and 7 of The Terminal List, the character Bijan Azad is depicted as a DCIS special agent.

== See also ==
- Coast Guard Investigative Service
- Department of the Air Force Office of Special Investigations
- Department of Defense Whistleblower Program
- Law enforcement agency
- Naval Criminal Investigative Service
- United States Army Counterintelligence
- United States Army Criminal Investigation Command
- United States Department of Defense
- United States Marine Corps Criminal Investigation Division
