= Huffman v. Office of Personnel Management =

Legal decision on whistleblower protections for federal employees

- Court: United States Court of Appeals for the Federal Circuit
- Full case name: Kenneth D. Huffman v. Office of Personnel Management
- Decided: August 15, 2001
- Citation: 263 F.3d 1341

Court membership
- Judges sitting: Haldane Robert Mayer, William Curtis Bryson, Timothy B. Dyk

Case opinions
- Majority: Dyk, joined by a unanimous court

Laws applied
- Whistleblower Protection Act

Huffman v. Office of Personnel Management, 263 F.3d 1341 (Fed. Cir. 2001) is a decision by the United States Court of Appeals for the Federal Circuit addressing a two decade-old conflict between the United States Congress and the U.S. Court of Appeals for the Federal Circuit over the depth of whistleblower protection available to federal civilian employees covered by the Whistleblower Protection Act of 1989. The discourse revolves around the meaning of the word 'any'.

== Facts of the case ==
The complainant, Kenneth Huffman alleged that he made protected disclosures to Inspector General Patrick McFarland of the Office of Personnel Management, including that McFarland improperly preselected an agency employee for the Senior Executive Service (SES). The allegation included the accusation that the complainant was removed as an Assistant Inspector General following these communications. Huffman's removal prompted his complaint under the Whistleblower Protection Act.

In 1994, the United States Congress passed an amendment to the Act. The legislative history of that amendment stated, " . . . it also is not possible to further clarify the clear language in section 2302(b)(8) that protection for 'any' whistleblowing disclosure truly means 'any.' A protected disclosure may be made as part of an employee's job duties, may concern policy or individual misconduct, and may be oral or written and to any audience inside or outside the agency, without restriction to time, place, motive or content." Under Senator Levin's view, Huffman's disclosures would have been protected.

Huffman took his case to the Merit Systems Protection Board, which held that it did not have jurisdiction under the Whistleblower Protection Act to intervene in Huffman's removal.

The case was argued before Chief Judge Mayer and Circuit Judges Bryson and Dyk of the Federal Circuit. James M. Eisenmann of Passman & Kaplan, P.C. argued for Huffman. James C. Caine was the trial attorney for the Commercial Litigation Branch, Civil Division, U.S. Department of Justice argued for the Office of Personnel Management. The government argued that whistleblower disclosures to persons who did not have authority to correct wrongdoing were not entitled to protection under the statute. The Federal Circuit remanded the case with respect to Huffman's disclosures concerning the conduct of employees other than his immediate supervisor.

== The Rule as a Summarization of Existing Case Law ==
Despite this Congressional intent in the 1994 amendment, the United States Court of Appeals for the Federal Circuit curtailed the scope of federal law by defining some communications outside the definition of 'whistleblower'. A series of Federal Circuit cases subsequent to 1994 took a narrow view of the scope of whistleblower protection. In Horton v. Dep't of the Navy, the court ruled that communications to co-workers, the wrong-doer, or to a supervisor were not acts of whistleblowing. In Willis v. Dep't of Agriculture, the court ruled that a whistleblower's disclosures to officials in the agency chain of command or those made in the course of normal duties were not protected. Then, finally, the court issued Huffman v. Office of Personnel Management, reaffirming Horton and Willis through the rule in Huffman. Finally, in Meuwissen v. Dep't of the Interior, the court ruled that a whistleblower's communication of previously known information does not qualify as a disclosure. In 2003, Senator Carl Levin of Michigan took to the Senate floor and noted that "[a]ll of these rulings violate clear Congressional intent to afford broad protection to whistleblower disclosures."

== Criticism of the case ==
Immediately following the release of Huffman, then-U.S. Special Counsel Elaine Kaplan noted that the court did actually reject the Justice Department's argument that would have left whistleblowers unprotected except when disclosures were made to persons with the actual authority to correct the alleged wrongdoing. Kaplan noted that "had the Court endorsed this argument, it would have gutted the WPA; obviously, whistleblowers cannot be required to guess at their peril whether the individual to whom they are disclosing wrongdoing possesses the legal authority to correct it." "Moreover," she noted, "the adoption of this argument would have meant that whistleblowers would not be protected when they made disclosures to the media or the public at large—precisely the opposite of what Congress intended when it enacted the WPA."

In her 2001 press statement, Kaplan also observed that the court's other rulings "appear to undermine in crucial respects the policies underlying the Whistleblower Protection Act: to encourage employees to come forward when they uncover serious wrongdoing during the course of their employment." The Office of Special Counsel noted that under the court's ruling employees are not protected when they make disclosures during the course of performing their duties, "an auditor at the Department of Defense, for example, who uncovers massive fraud and waste of funds, would not be protected against retaliation when he reports the fraud as part of his job duties up the chain of command. Similarly, a meat inspector with the Department of Agriculture would not be protected against retaliation by his superiors if they were displeased with his reports of serious health and safety violations by a meat packing plant." "The whole point of the WPA," Special Counsel Kaplan observed, "is that government employees, because of their job duties, are in a position to discover misconduct and malfeasance."

Finally, Kaplan noted, "the Federal Circuit's ruling that the WPA does not protect employees who make their disclosures directly to the person they suspect of wrongdoing is contrary to public policy because it would discourage employees from attempting to raise and resolve their concerns within the chain of command. An employee may reasonably suspect that their superior has engaged in misconduct, but may wish to confront the superior with their suspicions first, before making them public." In such situations, Special Counsel Kaplan observed, "the Federal Circuit's ruling would perversely require the employees to go public and embarrass the agency in order to maintain the Act's protection, where their concerns might well have been resolved in-house."
