= Intelligence Community Whistleblower Protection Act =

United States law

The Intelligence Community Whistleblower Protection Act of 1998, amending the Central Intelligence Agency Act of 1949 and the Inspector General Act of 1978, sets forth a procedure for employees and contractors of specified federal intelligence agencies to report complaints or information to the United States Congress about serious problems involving intelligence activities.

Under the ICWPA, an intelligence employee or contractor who intends to report to Congress a complaint or information of "urgent concern" involving an intelligence activity may report the complaint or information to their agency's inspector general or the Inspector General of the Intelligence Community (ICIG). Within a 14-day period, the ICIG must determine "whether the complaint or information appears credible," and upon finding the information to be credible, thereafter transfer the information to the head of the agency. The law then requires the DNI (or the relevant agency head) to forward the complaint to the congressional intelligence committees, along with any comments he wishes to make about the complaint, within seven days. If the ICIG does not deem the complaint or information to be credible or does not transmit the information to the head of the agency, the employee may provide the information directly to the House and Senate Intelligence Committees. However, the employee must first inform the ICIG of their intention to contact the intelligence committees directly and must follow the procedures specified in the Act.

The Act defines a matter of "urgent concern" as:

1. a serious or flagrant problem, abuse, violation of law or Executive order, or deficiency relating to the funding, administration, or operations of an intelligence activity involving classified information, but does not include differences of opinions concerning public policy matters;
2. A false statement to Congress, or a willful withholding from Congress, on an issue of material fact relating to the funding, administration, or operation of an intelligence activity; or
3. An action constituting reprisal or threat of reprisal in response to an employee's reporting an urgent concern.

ICWPA doesn't prohibit employment-related retaliation and it provides no mechanism, such as access to a court or administrative body, for challenging retaliation that may occur as a result of having made a disclosure. In 2006 Thomas Gimble, Acting Inspector General, Department of Defense, stated before the House Committee on Government Reform that the ICWPA is a 'misnomer' and that more properly the Act protects the communication of classified information to Congress. According to Michael German with the Brennan Center for Justice, the ICWPA, "provides a right to report internally but no remedy when that right is infringed, which means that there is no right at all."

According to the Office of the Director of National Intelligence, from 1999 to 2009, 10 complaints/disclosures were filed under this law, four of which were found to be credible by the relevant Inspector General. In three of these ten cases the whistleblower claimed that s/he was retaliated against: two CIA cases and one DOJ case. Subsequent investigations by the CIA and DOJ failed to find evidence of retaliation in any of these cases.

Additional protections for national security whistleblowers are provided through Presidential Policy Directive 19 and the Intelligence Authorization Act for Fiscal Year 2014. For more information about whistleblowers protections that apply to the intelligence community see the "national security protections" subheading under Whistleblower protection in the United States.
