= Intelligence Authorization Act for Fiscal Year 2014 =

United States Law

- Long title: To authorize appropriations for fiscal year 2014 for intelligence and intelligence-related activities of the United States Government and the Office of the Director of National Intelligence, the Central Intelligence Agency Retirement and Disability System, and for other purposes.
- Announced in: the 113th United States Congress
- Sponsored by: Sen. Dianne Feinstein (D, CA)
- Number of co-sponsors: 0

Citations
- Public law: Pub. L. 113–126 (text) (PDF)

Codification
- Acts affected: Intelligence Reform and Terrorism Prevention Act of 2004, Inspector General Act of 1978, National Security Act of 1947, Central Intelligence Agency Act of 1949, Central Intelligence Retirement Act, and others.
- U.S.C. sections affected: 50 U.S.C. § 3341, 5 U.S.C., 5 U.S.C. § 2303, 5 U.S.C. § 2302, 50 U.S.C. § 3033, and others.
- Agencies affected: National Geospatial-Intelligence Agency, United States Department of Justice, Office of the Inspector General, United States House of Representatives, United States Department of the Air Force, Inspector General of the Intelligence Community, Executive Office of the President, Central Intelligence Agency, United States Congress, Office of Management and Budget, Director of National Intelligence, United States Department of Energy, United States Department of State, Inspector General of the National Reconnaissance Office, National Reconnaissance Office, Federal Bureau of Investigation, United States Coast Guard, Drug Enforcement Administration, United States Department of the Navy, Office of Personnel Management, United States Department of the Treasury, Director of the National Reconnaissance Office, United States Department of Defense, National Security Agency, Department of Homeland Security, Chief Information Officer of the Intelligence Community, United States Department of the Army, Office of the Director of National Intelligence, Defense Intelligence Agency, United States Senate
- Authorizations of appropriations: At least $1,082,736,000 with an additional unlimited amount in fiscal year 2014.

Legislative history
- Introduced in the Senate as S. 1681 by Sen. Dianne Feinstein (D, CA) on November 12, 2013; Committee consideration by United States Senate Select Committee on Intelligence; Passed the Senate on June 11, 2014 (voice vote); Passed the House on June 24, 2014 (voice vote); Signed into law by President Barack Obama on July 7, 2014

The Intelligence Authorization Act for Fiscal Year 2014 is a U.S. public law that authorizes appropriations for fiscal year 2014 for intelligence activities of the U.S. government. The law authorizes there to be funding for intelligence agencies such as the Central Intelligence Agency or the National Security Agency, and a separate appropriations bill would also have to pass in order for those agencies to receive any money.

The law was introduced into the United States Senate during the 113th United States Congress. A similar bill, the Intelligence Authorization Act for Fiscal Years 2014 and 2015 (H.R. 4681; 113th Congress), was passed by the United States House of Representatives.

== Provisions of the bill ==
This summary is based largely on the summary provided by the Congressional Research Service, a public domain source.

The Intelligence Authorization Act for Fiscal Year 2014 - Title I: Budget and Personnel Authorizations - (Sec. 101) Authorizes appropriations for FY2014 for the conduct of intelligence and intelligence-related activities of the: (1) Office of the Director of National Intelligence; (2) Central Intelligence Agency (CIA); (3) United States Department of Defense (DOD); (4) Defense Intelligence Agency (DIA); (5) National Security Agency (NSA); (6) Departments of the Army, Navy, and Air Force; (7) Coast Guard; (8) Departments of State, the Treasury, Energy (DOE), and Justice (DOD); (9) Federal Bureau of Investigation (FBI); (10) Drug Enforcement Administration (DEA); (11) National Reconnaissance Office (NRO); (12) National Geospatial-Intelligence Agency (NGA); and (13) United States Department of Homeland Security (DHS).

(Sec. 102) Provides that the amounts authorized to be appropriated by this Act and the authorized personnel ceilings as of September 30, 2014, for intelligence activities are those specified in the classified Schedule of Authorizations, which shall be made available to the House and Senate Committees on Appropriations and the President. Prohibits the President from publicly disclosing the classified Schedule of Authorizations or any portion of such Schedule except as provided in the Implementing Recommendations of the 9/11 Commission Act of 2007, to the extent necessary to implement the budget, or as otherwise required by law.

(Sec. 103) Authorizes the Director of National Intelligence (DNI) to authorize employment of civilian personnel in excess of the number authorized for FY2014 when necessary for the performance of important intelligence functions, limited to 3% of the number of civilian personnel authorized for each intelligence element. Requires notification to the congressional intelligence committees of the use of such authority.

(Sec. 104) Authorizes appropriations for the Intelligence Community Management Account for FY2014, as well as the authorized personnel levels for elements within such Account (855 positions as of September 30, 2014). Allows funds allocated for advance research and development to remain available until September 30, 2015. Authorizes additional appropriations and personnel for the Account as specified in the classified Schedule of Authorizations.

Title II: Central Intelligence Agency Retirement and Disability System - (Sec. 201) Authorizes appropriations for FY2014 for the Central Intelligence Agency Retirement and Disability Fund.

(Sec. 202) Amends the Central Intelligence Agency Retirement Act to expand the definition of "qualifying service," for purposes of creditable service determinations under the Federal Employees Retirement System (FERS) and the Central Intelligence Agency Retirement and Disability System, to include duties in support of intelligence activities hazardous to life or health or duties that are so specialized as to be clearly distinguishable from normal government employment.

Title III: General Intelligence Community Matters - Subtitle A: General Matters - (Sec. 301) Declares that the authorization of appropriations by this Act shall not be deemed to authorize any intelligence activity that is not otherwise authorized by the United States Constitution or the laws of the United States.

(Sec. 302) Permits appropriations authorized by this Act for salary, pay, retirement, and other benefits for federal employees to be increased by such additional or supplemental amounts as necessary for increases in such compensation or benefits authorized by law.

(Sec. 303) Amends the National Security Act of 1947 to extend protections against the disclosure of the identity of individuals under the Freedom of Information Act (FOIA) to the Inspector General of the Intelligence Community.

(Sec. 304) Directs the President to designate certain U.S. officers or employees as functional managers for signals intelligence, human intelligence, geospatial intelligence, and other necessary intelligence disciplines as the President determines necessary. Requires such designated officers or employees to report annually to the congressional intelligence committees and the congressional armed services committees concerning the performance of their respective functions.

(Sec. 305) Requires the Office of the DNI, the CIA, the DIA, the NSA, the NRO, and the NGA to undergo a full financial audit each year beginning with their FY2014 financial statements. Requires the chief financial officer of each such agency to provide the congressional intelligence committees an annual audit report on each audit conducted.

(Sec. 306) Requires the chief information officer of each element of the intelligence community to conduct, and the Chief Information Officer of the Intelligence Community to compile and report on, inventories of all existing software licences of each element, including utilized and unutilized licenses.

(Sec. 307) Extends the authority for the Public Interest Declassification Board until December 31, 2018.

(Sec. 308) Amends the Inspector General Act of 1978 to permit an employee of an element of the intelligence community, or of a contractor to the intelligence community, who intends to report to Congress a complaint or information with respect to an urgent concern, to report such complaint or information to the Inspector General of the Intelligence Community.

Subtitle B: Targeted Lethal Force Oversight - (Sec. 311) Requires the head of an element of the intelligence community to notify the DNI upon determining that a U.S. person is knowingly engaged in acts of international terrorism against the United States such that the government is considering the legality or the use of targeted lethal force against that person.

Requires the DNI: (1) within 15 days after receipt of such notification, to complete an independent alternative analysis of the information relied on to support such determination; (2) to notify the Inspector General of the Intelligence Community and the congressional intelligence committees of the receipt of such notification; and (3) to notify such committees of the person's identity and the results of the independent analysis.

Directs the Inspector General to annually review, and report to the DNI and the congressional intelligence committees on, any notifications received and the compliance of each element of the intelligence community with all appropriate policies and procedures related to the use of targeted lethal force against a U.S. person.

(Sec. 312) Requires the President to prepare and make public an annual report on the total number of combatants and noncombatant civilians killed or injured during the preceding year by the use of targeted lethal force outside the United States by remotely piloted aircraft. Excludes from such report any use of targeted lethal force in Afghanistan prior to the end of combat operations or any use of targeted lethal force in a foreign country described by a future declaration of war or authorization for the use of military force.

Subtitle C: Reporting - (Sec. 321) Requires the Attorney General to provide an annual listing to the congressional intelligence committees of every opinion of the DOD Office of Legal Counsel that has been provided to an element of the intelligence community. Allows the President to: (1) limit access to information in such listing relating to a covert action, and (2) decline to disclose a particular listing on the ground of executive privilege.

(Sec. 322) Requires the DNI, the CIA Director, and each head of each element of the intelligence community within DOD to submit to specified congressional committees a copy of any plan pertaining to agency operations in the absence of appropriations that such officials have submitted to the OMB Director.

(Sec. 323) Requires the DNI to submit a report on the Syrian chemical weapons program.

(Sec. 324) Requires the DNI to establish procedures requiring each cleared intelligence contractor to report when a network or information system of such contractor has been successfully penetrated. Requires such procedures to provide for reports by contractors that describe the technique or method used in such penetration, a sample of the malicious software involved in such penetration, and a summary of information that has been potentially compromised by such penetration.

(Sec. 325) Repeals reporting requirements pertaining to: (1) the threat of attack on the United States using weapons of mass destruction; (2) commerce with, and assistance to, Cuba from other foreign countries; and (3) uncontrolled treaty-limited equipment.

Modifies reporting requirements to: (1) require the DNI to notify the congressional intelligence committees of the creation of an advisory committee (currently, an annual report is required); (2) terminate in 2014 (currently, 2015) the report on intelligence community business system transformation; (3) require semiannual (currently, quarterly) reports on the activities of privacy and civil liberties officers; and (4) require notification to congressional committees, rather than annual reports, of waivers of conditions for disqualification for security clearances.

Title IV: Matters Relating to Elements of the Intelligence Community - Subtitle A: National Security Agency - (Sec. 401) Amends the National Security Act of 1959 to require the Director of the National Security Agency (NSA) and the Inspector General of NSA to be appointed by the President with the advice and consent of the Senate.

Subtitle B: National Reconnaissance Office - (Sec. 411) Amends the National Security Act of 1947 to require the Director and the Inspector General of NRO to be appointed by the President with the advice and consent of the Senate.

Title V: Security Clearance Reform - (Sec. 502) Requires the DNI, in consultation with the DOD Secretary and the Director of the Office of Personnel Management (OPM), to conduct an analysis of the relative costs and benefits of improving the process for investigating persons for access to classified information.

(Sec. 503) Amends the Intelligence Reform and Terrorism Prevention Act of 2004 to prohibit an agency from rejecting another agency's access determination on the basis that such determination is out-of-scope, unless the rejecting agency does not employ any personnel who have background investigations that are out-of-scope. Defines "out-of-scope" to mean a background investigation or reinvestigation that is more than 7 years old in the case of a top secret clearance, more than 10 years old in the case of a secret clearance, or more than 15 years old in the case of a confidential clearance.

(Sec. 504) Requires the DNI to report to Congress each year, through 2017, on the reciprocal treatment of security clearances, including: (1) the periods of time required by authorized adjudicative agencies for accepting background investigations and determinations completed by an authorized investigative entity or authorized adjudicative agency; and (2) the total number of cases in which a background investigation or determination completed by an authorized investigative entity or adjudicative agency is, or is not, accepted by another agency.

(Sec. 505) Requires the DNI, the DOD Secretary, and the OPM Director to submit to Congress a strategic plan for improving the process for periodic reinvestigations.

Title VI: Intelligence Community Whistleblower Protections - (Sec. 601) Extends whistleblower protections for employees of an intelligence community element (defined as the CIA, the DIA, the NGA, the NSA, the Office of the DNI, the NRO, and any executive agency that is determined to have as its principal function the conduct of foreign intelligence or counterintelligence activities, excluding the FBI).

(Sec. 602) Amends the Intelligence Reform and Terrorism Prevention Act of 2004 to: (1) require the development of policies and procedures that permit individuals who, in good faith, appeal an adverse security clearance determination to remain employed while the appeal is pending; (2) require the development and implementation of uniform and consistent policies and procedures to ensure protections during the process for denying, suspending, or revoking a security clearance or access to classified information; and (3) prohibit the revocation of a security clearance or access determination in retaliation for a protected whistleblower disclosure.

Allows a defense intelligence employee to appeal an agency head's adverse final order or decision to the appellate review board established by this title. Grants the board authority to: (1) order corrective action and award compensatory damages and expenses if it determines that an adverse security clearance determination was retaliatory, and (2) recommend the reinstatement of an employee and a security clearance. Requires the review board to notify specified congressional committees of any orders it issues. Requires an agency to notify such committees if it does not follow the board's recommendation to reinstate a security clearance.

(Sec. 603) Amends the Inspector General Act of 1978 to require the Inspector General to submit a complaint or information submitted under the Intelligence Community Whistleblower Protection Act or the Central Intelligence Agency Act of 1949 to the DNI, or to the DOD Secretary if the intelligence unit is within DOD, upon determining that submission of the complaint or information to the agency head would create a conflict of interest. Requires the DNI to consult with members of the appellate review board regarding all submissions. Allows an individual who has submitted a complaint or information to an Inspector General to notify any Member of Congress, or congressional staff members, of the submissions made and the date of such submissions.

(Sec. 604) Defines "congressional oversight committees" to mean the congressional intelligence committees, the Senate Committee on Homeland Security and Governmental Affairs, and the House Committee on Oversight and Government Reform.

Requires: (1) the DNI to: (1) prescribe regulations to ensure that a personnel action shall not be taken against an employee of an intelligence community element as a reprisal for any whistleblower disclosure relating to intelligence activities, (2) establish an appellate review board to hear whistleblower appeals related to security clearance access determinations, and (3) submit a report on the status of the implementation of such regulations to the congressional oversight committees.

Renders whistleblower protections under this Act inapplicable to terminations of intelligence community whistleblowers who are personally terminated by the DOD Secretary, the DNI, the CIA Director, or the head of any federal agency who determines the termination to be in the interest of the United States. Requires notification of any termination to the congressional oversight committees within five days of such termination.

Title VII: Other Matters - (Sec. 701) Eliminates the termination date for provisions requiring notification to congressional intelligence committees regarding the authorized disclosure of national intelligence or intelligence related to national security.

(Sec. 702) Amends the Central Intelligence Agency Act of 1949 to authorize the CIA Director to engage in fundraising for the benefit of nonprofit organizations that provide support to surviving family members of deceased CIA employees or for the welfare, education, or recreation of current CIA employees, former employees, or their family members.

(Sec. 703) Provides for the compliance of the budgetary effects of this Act with requirements of the Statutory Pay-As-You-Go Act of 2010.

== Congressional Budget Office report ==
This summary is based largely on the summary provided by the Congressional Budget Office, as reported by the Senate Select Committee on Intelligence on November 12, 2013. This is a public domain source.

S. 1681 would authorize appropriations for fiscal year 2014 for intelligence activities of the U.S. government. Since Congressional Budget Office (CBO) does not provide estimates for classified programs, this estimate addresses only the unclassified aspects of the bill. On that limited basis, and assuming appropriation of the authorized amounts, the CBO estimates that implementing the unclassified provisions of S. 1681 would cost $564 million over the 2014-2019 period.

== Procedural history ==
The Intelligence Authorization Act for Fiscal Year 2014 was introduced into the United States Senate on November 12, 2013 by Sen. Dianne Feinstein (D, CA). The bill was referred to the United States Senate Select Committee on Intelligence. It was reported alongside Senate report 113-120. On June 11, 2014, the Senate passed the bill with an amendment by voice vote. The House voted in a voice vote on June 24, 2014 to pass the bill. President Barack Obama signed it into law on July 7, 2014.

== Debate and discussion ==
Senator Feinstein, who introduced the bill, spoke in favor of it, saying that "Congress has a responsibility to ensure the DNI and other intelligence leaders have the resources and flexibility they need to protect the nation." Senator Saxby Chambliss (R-GA) argued that the bill provides "clear guidance and appropriate resources to the intelligence community, while enhancing the committee's oversight of vital intelligence activities."

== See also ==
- List of bills in the 113th United States Congress
- United States Intelligence Community
