= Economic impact of illegal immigration to the United States =

The economic impact of illegal immigration to the United States refers to the effects of economic activities of migrants without a legal citizenship or residency. Because of the political controversy around illegal immigration, the impact is generally divided into two groups: activities that have a positive effect on legal residents, such as increased economic activity and increased tax income, and activities that have a negative effect on legal residents, such as usage of government programs and decreased wages.

== Illegal immigrant population ==
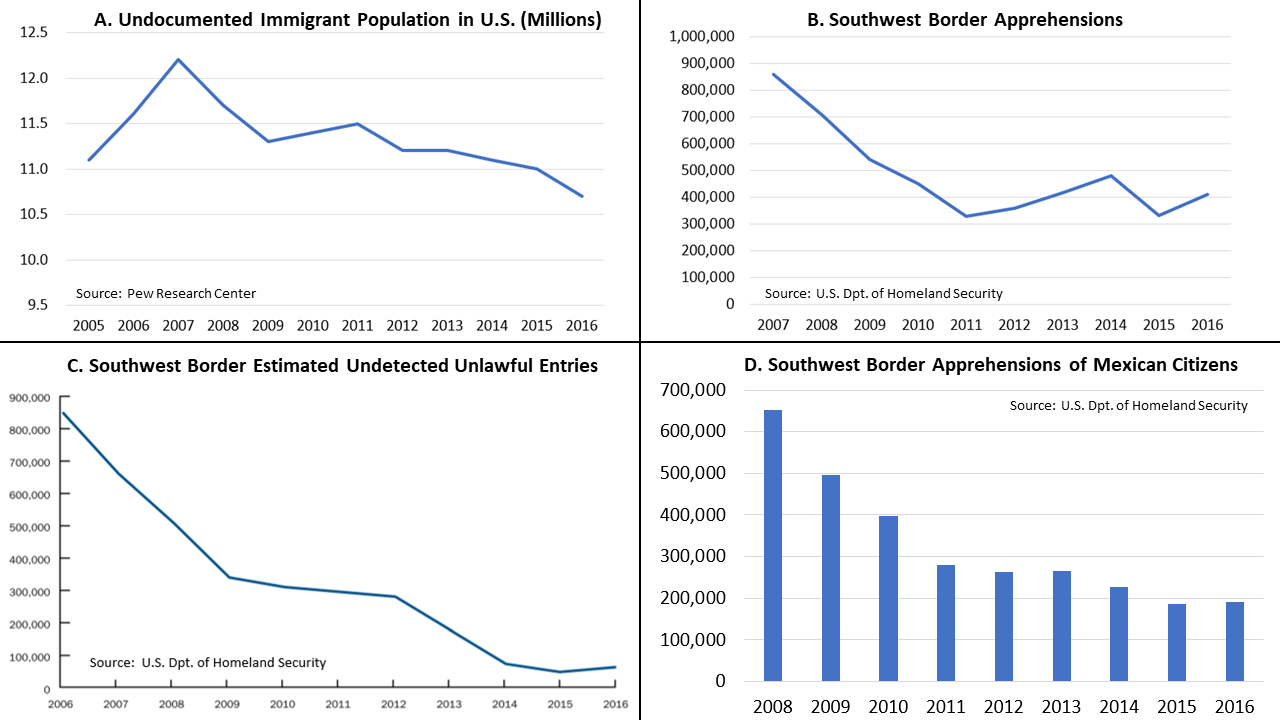
Both the population of unauthorized immigrants in the U.S. and southwestern border apprehensions have declined significantly over the past decade.

According to the Pew Research Center, there were 14-15 million illegal immigrants living in the United States as of 2023, statistically indicating a dramatic increase from the 10-11 million population in 2022. According to an article the Pew Research Center published on July 22, 2024, the unauthorized immigrant population in the U.S. grew to 11 million in 2022, but remained below the peak of 12.2 million in 2007, following a steady increase that began in 1990. An estimated 5.6 million unauthorized immigrants were from Mexico in 2015 and 2016, down from 6.4 million in 2009. This trend continues to decrease the number of unauthorized immigrants from Mexico dropped to 4 million in 2022. While it continues to drop, Mexico is still the most common country of origin for immigrants in the U.S. Non-Mexicans numbered 5.7 million, indicating Mexicans are no longer the clear majority of unauthorized immigrants. The unauthorized immigrant population from other countries grew. The U.S. civilian workforce includes 8 million unauthorized immigrants, accounting for 5% of those working or looking for work in 2014. This number has been relatively stable since 2007, ranging between 8.0 and 8.3 million. Unauthorized immigrants make up about 4.8% of the U.S. workforce in 2022. They are primarily concentrated in seven states: California, New Mexico, Texas, Florida, New York, New Jersey, and Illinois. About two-thirds have been in the U.S. for more than a decade. Since then, between the years of 2019 to 2022, the illegal immigration population grew in six states: Florida, Massachusetts, New Jersey, New York, and Texas. The only state that saw a decrease in the population was California.

The reduction has been driven mainly by a decrease in the number of new immigrants from Mexico, the single largest source. Net immigration from Mexico to the U.S. has stopped and possibly reversed since 2010. At its peak in 2000, about 770,000 immigrants arrived annually from Mexico; the majority arrived illegally. By 2010, the inflow had dropped to about 140,000—a majority of whom arrived as legal immigrants.

At its peak in August 2007, the number of illegal immigrants in the U.S. was 12.5 million. This decreased by 1.3 million to 11.2 million by July 2008 (11%) due to either increased law enforcement or fewer job opportunities. Based on the Department of Homeland Security estimates in 2009, unauthorized immigrant population living in the United States decreased to 10.8 million in January 2009. On the whole, between 2000 and 2009, the unauthorized immigrant population grew by 27 percent. The size of illegal immigrants that have entered the U.S. declined by almost 300 thousand in 2018 to 2020, but then grew by 630 thousand from 2020 to 2022.

Immigrants to the U.S. are concentrated at both the high and low-income ends of the U.S. labor market, determined largely by their educational attainment. In 2004, at the low end, half of workers aged 25 and older who lacked a diploma were from Mexico and Central America. These workers were employed in jobs that required little formal education, such as construction labor and dishwashing, and on average they earned much less than did the average native worker.

== Economic impact of illegal immigrants ==
=== Consumer demand ===
An employer can gain economic advantages when hiring workers without legal authorization, because these employees may accept lower wages and minimal benefits out of necessity. This can reduce labor costs relative to paying documented workers with taxpayer identification numbers and full legal protections. While unauthorized immigrants are legally barred from work in the United States, they nonetheless constitute a significant part of the labor force. In 2023, an estimated 9.7 million unauthorized immigrants were part of the U.S. workforce, accounting for about 5.6 % of all workers — one of the highest shares on record.

According to an article by Council on Foreign Relations ,undocumented households collectively held about $299 billion in spending power and nearly $389 billion in combined income in 2023, indicating that most earnings were quickly circulated back into the economy through consumption and taxes. This highlights that most immigrant workers with low qualifications spend most of what they earn on consumption needs.

By comparison, average wages for U.S. workers generally exceed the federal minimum and have continued to rise in recent years, with private-sector average hourly earnings around $36–$37 per hour in late 2025.

Because unauthorized workers are present in construction, agriculture, hospitality, and other labor-intensive sectors, their participation helps support overall economic activity and employment. Estimates from 2023 suggest that undocumented immigrants filled around 8.5 million jobs and are embedded across many industries despite their status.

=== Budgetary impacts ===
In recent years, the number of people arriving in the United States has risen sharply. Most of this increase is due to a growth in the group the Congressional Budget Office (CBO) classifies as other foreign nationals. Some individuals in this category have been authorized to enter or stay in the country, while others have not; additional details about this group’s makeup are discussed later. Based on trends observed before 2020, CBO would have expected net immigration in this category to average about 200,000 people annually. Instead, under CBO’s projections, net immigration exceeds that expected level by a cumulative 8.7 million people between 2021 and 2026.

A 2024 report examines how that surge in immigration from 2021 to 2026 affects CBO’s baseline economic and budget projections for the 2024–2034 period. Specifically, it focuses only on the incremental effects of the surge, rather than the overall impact of all immigrants who arrived during those years or earlier and were already living in the United States. The analysis centers on federal revenues, mandatory spending, and interest on the debt. While the report offers a general discussion of possible implications for discretionary spending, it does not quantify effects on state and local government budgets.

To estimate the impact of the immigration increase, CBO developed a counterfactual scenario in which the surge does not occur. In that scenario, net immigration of people in the other-foreign-national category remains at 200,000 per year from 2021 through 2034, matching baseline assumptions from 2027 onward. CBO then produced economic and budget projections under that scenario and compared them with its baseline projections. The differences between the two sets of outcomes represent CBO’s estimates of the effects of the immigration surge.

CBO emphasizes that these estimates are highly uncertain and will be updated as additional data and information become available.

Impacts on the Budget

According to CBO’s baseline projections, the immigration surge increases federal revenues, mandatory spending, and interest costs, but overall it reduces cumulative federal deficits by $0.9 trillion over the 2024–2034 period. Some of these budgetary effects result directly from having more people paying taxes and receiving federal benefits. Others arise indirectly from changes in the economy caused by the surge, including higher interest rates and increased productivity among workers who are not part of the surge population.

CBO estimates that federal revenues increase by $1.2 trillion over the 2024–2034 period as a result of the surge. The annual revenue effect grows over time, reaching $167 billion—equal to 2.2 percent of total revenues—in 2034. Most of this increase comes from individual income and payroll taxes paid by immigrants in the surge population. Additional revenue gains stem from higher overall economic activity.

Over the same period, the surge raises spending on federal mandatory programs and net interest by a total of $0.3 trillion. Spending on certain mandatory programs rises over time as more immigrants in the surge population, along with their U.S.-born children, become eligible for benefits. By 2034, those benefits increase mandatory spending by $23 billion, or 0.4 percent of the total. Economywide effects of the surge also raise annual spending, reaching $27 billion in 2034. Higher interest rates driven by the surge lead to increased interest costs on federal debt. Altogether, total federal outlays in 2034 are $50 billion higher because of the surge.

These estimates exclude discretionary spending, which depends on future congressional appropriations. Nevertheless, CBO expects the surge to place additional demands on discretionary-funded programs, particularly those administered by the Department of Homeland Security and the Office of Refugee Resettlement within the Department of Health and Human Services. In 2024, funding for discretionary activities directly related to immigration totaled $37 billion, which is $1 billion more than in 2019 after adjusting for inflation, and the Administration has requested further increases for 2024.

The surge is also expected to affect other discretionary programs tied to population size, such as funding for K–12 education, income support, and infrastructure. If funding for these broad categories rose proportionally with the population increase from the surge, CBO estimates those increases would amount to $24 billion in 2034 and $0.2 trillion over the 2024–2034 period.

CBO does not include discretionary spending effects in its budget totals because such spending will depend on future legislative decisions. Lawmakers could address increased needs either by raising overall appropriations or reallocating funds from other areas.

State and local government budgets are also likely to be affected, though the impact will differ across jurisdictions. Existing research generally finds that immigration increases costs for state and local governments more than it increases revenues, and CBO expects a similar outcome for the current surge. However, the surge population differs in some ways from immigrant groups examined in past studies, and CBO has not conducted a comprehensive analysis of its effects on state and local finances.

Impacts on the Economy

Many of the projected budgetary impacts of the immigration surge are driven by broader economic changes. In CBO’s projections, the surge increases total nominal gross domestic product by $1.3 trillion, or 3.2 percent, in 2034, and by $8.9 trillion cumulatively over the 2024–2034 period. Total wages paid annually also rise, with the increase reaching about 3 percent in 2034. These higher wages significantly contribute to increased federal revenues because they are subject to income and payroll taxes.

Additionally, two main consequences of the surge—faster labor force growth and stronger demand for housing investment—raise the return on capital and place upward pressure on interest rates. Those higher interest rates are a key factor behind the increase in federal spending.

Within the labor market, workers in the surge population initially earn lower wages than other U.S. residents with similar educational attainment, on average, but their wages converge over time in CBO’s estimates. Through 2026, wage growth for people not in the surge population is slightly lower than it would have been without the surge, largely because wages for workers with 12 or fewer years of education grow more slowly. In later years, this effect reverses: wage growth for non-surge workers increases slightly due to higher productivity associated with innovation and because the larger number of less-educated workers raises demand for more-educated workers to complement them.

=== Price levels ===
NPR reported in March 2006 that when the wages of lower-skilled workers go down, the rest of America benefits by paying lower prices for things like restaurant meals, agricultural produce and construction. The economic impact of unauthorized immigration is far smaller than other trends in the economy, such as the increasing use of automation in manufacturing or the growth in global trade. But economists generally believe that when averaged over the whole economy, the effect is a small net positive. Harvard's George Borjas says the average American's wealth is increased by less than 1 percent because of unauthorized immigration.

According to the report presented by Eleanor Chelimsky and the team, hiring an illegal immigrant can have both negative as well as positive effects. For instance, if a restaurant hires a cheap labor of unauthorized workers, it will reduce the employer's cost eventually leading them to reduce the price for the foods served in the restaurant. The illegal workers are hired by the employers in the companies, competing in the same market with similar businesses that are hiring the legal workers. Due to the competition on the products sold in that free market, increase in illegal immigration may decrease the wage rate of the legal workers. In case of the inflow of unauthorized workers reducing the costs of operation leading to the reduction of prices on a product/service provided, the demand for the services of legal workers with low-skill jobs (such as fast-food restaurants, agricultural sectors and construction) will decrease. However, on a positive note, the reduced price on the menu will attract more customers increasing their volume of sales. As a result, this will "increase the demand for the noncompeting category of workers, such as chefs or waiters".

While this may seem beneficial for employers, unauthorized immigrants are being paid less than their peers. While the pay difference could be explained by level of education it could also be because they have no leverage in asking for more pay. While there is no concrete date on the pay of illegal workers, based on demographic and socioeconomic data, we can inference that as of July 2019, undocumented workers are paid 42% less than the wages of U.S.-born citizens.

=== Impact on wages ===
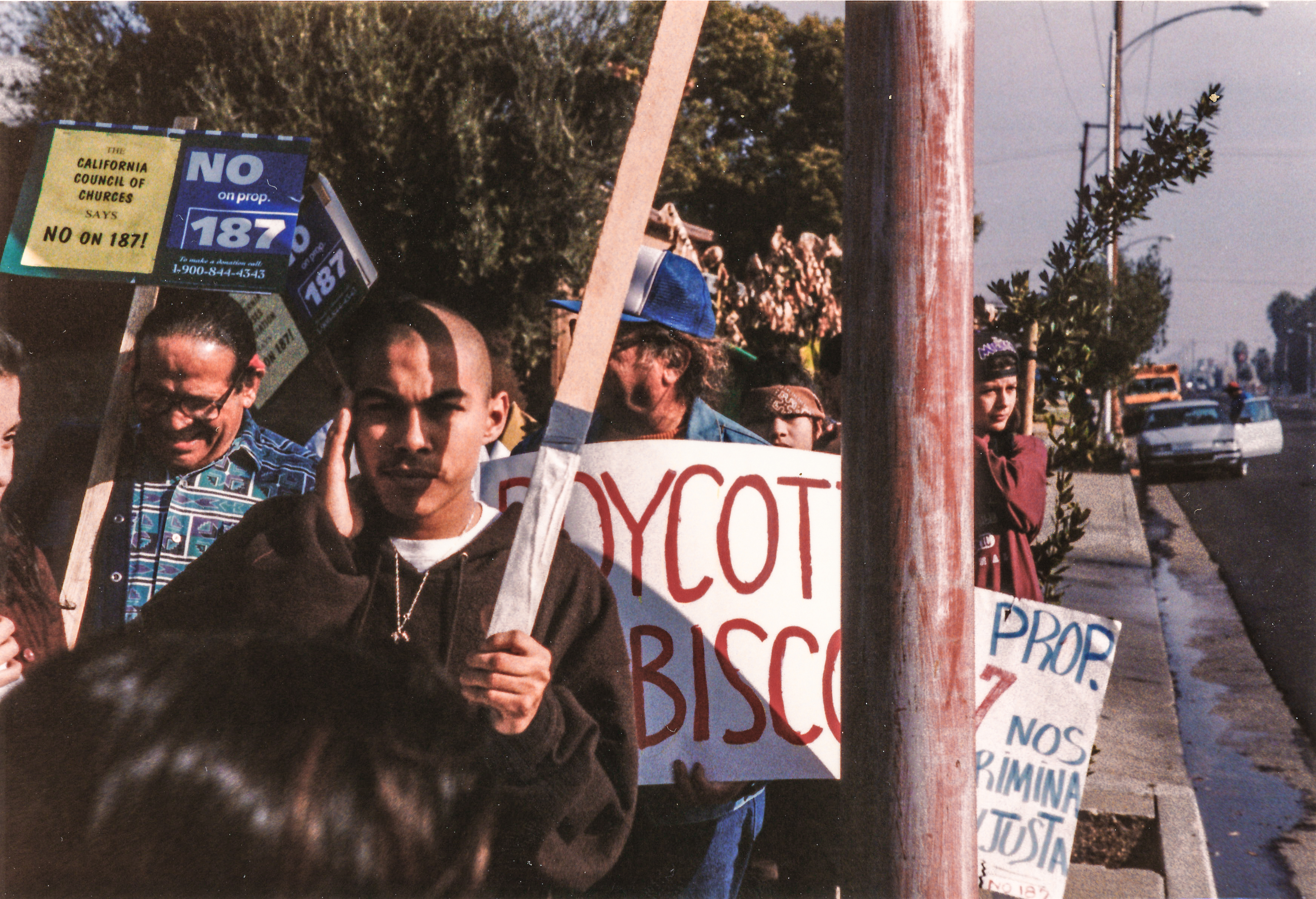
Protesters of Proposition 187 in Fresno, California, in 1994

Economists have different conclusions regarding the impact on wages from immigration, both legal and illegal. It is challenging to separate the impact of illegal immigration (generally workers with lower educational attainment) from immigration overall. Studies generally conclude there is a small adverse impact on the wages of lower-skilled workers from immigration and some benefit for higher-skilled workers:

- Research by economist David Card (University of California, Berkeley) indicated the effect of immigration on native born workers without high school degrees is limited, perhaps reducing the wages of high school dropouts by 5.1% over 20 years.
- In 2007, Harvard University economist George Borjas wrote that, "Economic theory implies that immigration should lower the wage of competing workers and increase the wage of complementary workers. For example, an influx of foreign-born laborers reduces the economic opportunities for laborers—all laborers now face stiffer competition in the labor market. At the same time, high-skill natives may gain substantially. They pay less for the services that laborers provide, such as painting the house and mowing the lawn, and natives who hire these laborers can now specialize in producing the goods and services that better suit their skills." Borjas' other research also indicated that "high-school dropouts experience a substantial wage loss from immigration of 6.3% in the short run and 3.1% over the long haul as labor markets adjust to the increased number of workers."
- A 2015 National Academy of Sciences report concluded that native-born workers who are substitutes for immigrants (e.g., lower-skilled workers in the case of illegal immigrants) "will experience negative wage effects." The report continues: "In summary, the immigration surplus [overall net benefit from immigration] stems from the increase in the return to capital that results from the increased supply of labor and the subsequent fall in wages. Natives who own more capital will receive more income from the immigration surplus than natives who own less capital, who can consequently be adversely affected."
- The Brookings Institution reported in 2012 that: "[T]he most recent economic evidence suggests that, on average, immigrant workers increase the opportunities and incomes of Americans. Based on a survey of the academic literature, economists do not tend to find that immigrants cause any sizeable decrease in wages and employment of U.S.-born citizens, and instead may raise wages and lower prices in the aggregate." However, certain groups may be adversely affected. Brookings pointed to two studies at the opposite ends of the impact spectrum, one (Borjas-Katz 2007) indicating a 4.5% reduction in the wages of native workers that were high-school dropouts and a roughly 1.6% reduction for native college graduates, with another (Ottaviano-Peri 2008) indicating a small positive for all education levels.

In 2008, Gordon H. Hanson at University of California–San Diego and National Bureau of Economic Research performed a study to see if illegal immigration affects native workers employment. From the study was concluded that unauthorized immigrants provide a source of manpower in agriculture, construction, food processing, building cleaning and maintenance, and other low-end jobs. Cities with a high percentage of illegal immigration were examined in this study and data showed that illegal immigrants overall impact on the U.S. economy is small. On the other hand, U.S. employers gain from lower labor costs and the ability to use their land, capital, and technology more productively.

=== Health care ===
Reuters reported that illegal immigrants, as well as legal immigrants in the country less than five years, generally are not eligible for Medicaid. However, they can get Medicaid coverage for health emergencies if they are in a category of people otherwise eligible, such as children, pregnant women, families with dependent children, elderly or disabled individuals, and meet other requirements. The cost of this emergency care was less than 1% of Medicaid costs in North Carolina from 2001 to 2004 and the majority was for childbirth and related complications. USA Today reported that "Illegal immigrants can get emergency care through Medicaid, the federal-state program for the poor and people with disabilities. But they can't get non-emergency care unless they pay. They are ineligible for most other public benefits."

Because of the U.S. Emergency Medical Treatment and Active Labor Act of 1986 (42 U.S.C. § 1395dd), most hospitals may not refuse anyone treatment for an emergency medical condition because of citizenship, legal status, or ability to pay. An example of the cost conflict between federal government, state and local government, and private institutions, the Immigration and Naturalization Service brings injured and ill unauthorized immigrants to hospital emergency rooms but does not pay for their medical care. Almost $190 million, or about 25 percent, of the uncompensated costs Southwest border county hospitals incurred resulted from emergency medical treatment provided to illegal immigrants.

At least two research studies have been done which attempt to discover the cost of health care for illegal immigrants by asking the illegal themselves.

- A phone survey in which Alexander Ortega and colleagues at the University of California asked illegal immigrants how often they receive medical care reported that illegal immigrants are no more likely to visit the emergency room than native born Americans.
- A RAND study concluded that the total federal cost of providing medical expenses for the 78% illegal immigrants without health insurance coverage was $1.1 billion, with immigrants paying $321 million of health care costs out-of-pocket. The study found that illegal immigrants tend to visit physicians less frequently than U.S. citizens because they are younger and because people with chronic health problems are less likely to migrate.

Moreover, studies have also shown that not providing illegal immigrants with a decent healthcare might actually cost the country in the long-run rather than save expenses. In 2000, researchers compared the perinatal outcomes and costs of illegal women with and without prenatal care and inferred the impact of denial of prenatal benefits to illegal immigrants in California. Nearly 10% of illegal women had no prenatal care. These women were nearly 4 times as likely to be delivered of low birth weight infants and more than 7 times as likely to be delivered of premature infants as were illegal women who had prenatal care. For every dollar cut from prenatal care, an increase of $3.33 in the cost of postnatal care and $4.63 in incremental long-term cost were expected. Elimination of publicly funded prenatal care for illegal women could save the state $58 million in direct prenatal care costs but could cost taxpayers as much as $194 million more in postnatal care, resulting in a net cost of $136 million initially and $211 million in long-term costs. Although their parents are illegal immigrants, these children are actually U.S. citizens.

=== Effect on income inequality ===
Economist David Card wrote in 2009 that immigration (legal and illegal) has a minor impact on income inequality and wages: "Together these results imply that the impacts of recent immigrant inflows on the relative wages of U.S. natives are small. The effects on overall wage inequality (including natives and immigrants) are larger, reflecting the concentration of immigrants in the tails of the skill distribution and higher residual inequality among immigrants than natives. Even so, immigration accounts for a small share (5%) of the increase in U.S. wage inequality between 1980 and 2000."

=== Overall benefits and costs ===
Members of the IGM Economic Experts Panel were asked in December 2013 whether they agreed or disagreed with the following statement: "The average US citizen would be better off if a larger number of low-skilled foreign workers were legally allowed to enter the US each year." Fifty-two percent either agreed or strongly agreed with the statement, with 28% uncertain and 9% disagreeing. Regarding a second statement, that low-skilled American workers would be "substantially worse off" if more low-skilled immigrants were allowed entry, 50% agreed or strongly agreed, with 30% uncertain and 9% disagreeing or strongly disagreeing. In other words, despite an overall benefit for the average American, some low-skilled workers already in the U.S. would probably be adversely impacted by a greater supply of low-skilled labor.

== Cost-benefit analysis ==
Aviva Chomsky, a professor at Salem State College, states that "Early studies in California and in the Southwest and in the Southeast...have come to the same conclusions. Immigrants, legal and illegal, are more likely to pay taxes than they are to use public services. Illegal immigrants are not eligible for most public services and live in fear of revealing themselves to government authorities. Households headed by illegal immigrants use less than half the amount of federal services that households headed by documented immigrants or citizens make use of."

National Public Radio (NPR) wrote in 2006: "Supporters of a crackdown argue that the U.S. economy would benefit if illegal immigrants were to leave, because U.S. employers would be forced to raise wages to attract American workers. Critics of this approach say the loss of illegal immigrants would stall the U.S. economy, saying illegal workers do many jobs few native-born Americans will do."

Professor of Law Francine Lipman writes that the belief that illegal migrants are exploiting the U.S. economy and that they cost more in services than they contribute to the economy is "undeniably false". Lipman asserts that "illegal immigrants actually contribute more to public coffers in taxes than they cost in social services" and "contribute to the U.S. economy through their investments and consumption of goods and services; filling of millions of essential worker positions resulting in subsidiary job creation, increased productivity and lower costs of goods and services; and unrequited contributions to Social Security, Medicare and unemployment insurance programs."

=== Relative contribution by income tax bracket ===
PEW studies on unauthorized immigrants estimates that the average household of 3.1 persons earns about $36,000 per year. This average wage is consistent with the PEW estimate that 49% of illegal immigrants have not graduated from high school.

The Congressional Budget Office (CBO) estimates that people in this salary bracket (the second quintile) pay about 6.8% of their income in Federal taxes.

The Heritage Foundation estimates that the average household in the bottom quintile received $29,015 in benefits and paid $4,251 in Federal, state and local taxes. In the second quintile the average household received $24,709 in benefits and paid $9,524 in Federal, state and local taxes. In the top quintile, the average household received $21,515 in benefits and services and paid $69,704 in Federal, state and local taxes. However, it is unclear how much benefit the average unauthorized immigrant household is eligible for.

=== Aging U.S. population ===
Studies have shown that immigrants contribute to the labor force, stimulate demand in various industries, and foster economic growth. They help maintain a favorable ratio of workers to retirees, supporting the aging population. Immigrants and their descendants make up a substantial portion of current and projected workforce growth. Without immigrants, the proportion of working-age adults and workers in the overall population would decline significantly. Immigration also has a positive impact on the Social Security trust fund and the actuarial balance in Medicare, strengthening these important programs. The higher labor force participation of foreign-born individuals, particularly among young first-generation immigrants, highlights their role in the workforce.

=== Heritage Foundation study ===
In 2013, Robert Rector and Jason Richwine of The Heritage Foundation released a study concluding that as of 2010, the "average unlawful immigrant household" had a net deficit (benefits received minus taxes paid) of $14,387 per household. Critics of the Rector-Richwine report "questioned several assumptions made by the report's authors—everything from the amount that legalization could boost earnings for immigrants to the amount of welfare they may use." The Heritage report purported to project costs over a 50-year period and assumed no changes to Social Security or Medicare, which prompted criticism that the study was overly speculative. The report also counted "the cost of benefits paid to the children of those living in the U.S. illegally, even though many of those children by law are citizens."

The methodology and conclusions of The Heritage Foundation's 2013 study were sharply criticized as flawed by, among others, Alex Nowrasteh of the Cato Institute, Doug Holtz-Eakin of the American Action Forum, and Tim Kane at the Hudson Institute. Nowrasteh wrote that The Heritage Foundation's refusal to account for GDP growth and increased economic productivity from immigration led to "a massive underestimation of the economic benefits of immigration and diminishing estimated tax revenue." Republican Senator Marco Rubio of Florida also criticized the report.

=== Income taxes and eligibility for tax credits ===
Income taxes and eligibility for tax credits are determined based on people's status of lawful permanent residency. Or else, it is based on the fact, how long anyone has been staying in the United States, despite them being here legally or not. The Congressional Budget Office does not have the estimation of the amount of federal taxes paid by the illegal immigrants in the country.

=== Eligibility for other benefits ===
Those people who have the permanent legal status are eligible for most of the government benefits such as Social Security, Medicare, Refundable tax Credits, Unemployment Insurance, and Pell Grants and Student Loans. The illegal immigrants staying in U.S., however, are not eligible for these federal programs except for the Child Nutrition Programs. Although few exceptions may apply regarding the Medicare, Social Security, Child Health Insurance Program and Refundable Tax Credits. Karoly and Perez-Arce (2016) did the case study on college tuition and came to the finding of a policy-relevant results. The policy to provide in-state tuition benefits to the illegal immigrants resulted with direct and secondary economic and fiscal effects. This policy provided incentives to the people born outside of the United States to come to the country to take the advantage of the benefit. This direct cost, in a long run creates more high-skilled workers, who would raise wages, in no time, and tax revenues, improving the overall fiscal picture.

== See also ==
- DREAM Act
- Economic results of migration
- E-Verify
- Gallegly amendment
- Immigration and crime
- Mexica Movement
- Plyler v. Doe
- Proposition 187
