= Mansbridge (disambiguation) =

Mansbridge is a suburb of Southampton, England.

Mansbridge may also refer to:

- Albert Mansbridge (1876–1952), British educator
- Jane Mansbridge (born 1939), Harvard professor
- John Mansbridge (artist) (1901–1981), British artist
- John B. Mansbridge (1917–2016), American art director
- Peter Mansbridge (born 1948), Canadian journalist and anchor of The National
- Ronald Mansbridge (1905–2006), publisher, author and wit
