= Florian Ederer =

Economist

Academic background
- Education: University of Oxford (BA, MPhil); Massachusetts Institute of Technology (PhD)
- Doctoral advisors: Bengt Holmström; Robert Gibbons

Academic work
- Discipline: Industrial organization; Competition policy; Economics of innovation
- Institutions: Boston University; Yale School of Management; UCLA Anderson School of Management

Florian Ederer is an economist and the Allen and Kelli Questrom Professor in Markets, Public Policy and Law at Boston University's Questrom School of Business. His research focuses on innovation, competition policy, and the organization of firms.

== Education and career ==
Ederer received undergraduate and master's degrees from the University of Oxford and a doctorate in economics from the Massachusetts Institute of Technology. Before joining Boston University, he held faculty positions at the UCLA Anderson School of Management and the Yale School of Management.

== Research ==
=== Innovation and acquisitions ===
With Colleen Cunningham and Song Ma, Ederer co-authored Killer Acquisitions, a study published in the Journal of Political Economy in 2021. Using pharmaceutical industry data, the authors found that acquired drug projects were less likely to be developed when they overlapped with the buyer's existing products, and estimated that 5.3–7.4% of acquisitions in their sample fit their definition of a "killer acquisition". The Financial Times reported that the paper drew significant policy attention beyond pharmaceuticals.

Together with Bruno Pellegrino, Ederer examined changes in the routes by which venture capital-backed startups exit, showing that acquisitions had become more common relative to initial public offerings since the mid-1990s. This shift in exit strategies may have contributed to increased market concentration.

=== Common ownership ===
Ederer has studied common ownership, in which investors hold stakes in firms that compete with one another. In work with Miguel Antón, Mireia Giné, and Martin Schmalz, he found that managerial incentives were less closely tied to firm performance at companies with greater common ownership, consistent with the idea that common shareholders benefit from softer product market competition.

In joint work with Bruno Pellegrino, he analyzed how overlapping ownership of competing companies could affect prices and consumer welfare in the United States. The authors estimated that the welfare loss attributed to common ownership was substantial, ranging from 3.5% to 13.2% of total surplus depending on assumptions about corporate governance.

=== Other research ===
Ederer's earlier research included experimental work on social learning and peer effects in financial decisions and on trust and promise-keeping over time.

With Paul Goldsmith-Pinkham and Kyle Jensen, Ederer studied the anonymous Economics Job Market Rumors forum by developing a method for associating many posts with the IP addresses from which they originated. The study found that users posting racist and sexist content included economists at universities, government institutions, and private sector organizations.

== Awards ==
In 2017, while teaching at Yale, Ederer was included in Poets&Quants' list of 40 business school professors under the age of 40.

Ederer, Cunningham, and Ma received the 2022 Jerry S. Cohen Award for Antitrust Scholarship for Killer Acquisitions and the Best Paper on Competition Economics Prize from the Association of Competition Economics. Ederer received the Jerry S. Cohen Award for Antitrust Scholarship again in 2024 with Antón, Giné, and Schmalz for their paper on common ownership and managerial incentives.

Ederer and Bruno Pellegrino received the Best Paper Award at the 2022 Econometric Society European Meeting for A Tale of Two Networks: Common Ownership and Product Market Rivalry.
