= Women in economics =

Women are under-represented in the economics profession worldwide. This has wide social and material implications, as economists work in banks and government, and have a direct role in policy making. Studies have shown that decisions made and executed by diverse teams delivered 60% better results. While many other fields, including STEM fields, have seen growth in the share of professors and students who are women, economics has stagnated with little improvement at any level in the last 15 years. In the United States, the ratio of male to female undergraduate economics students has been about three to one for over 20 years. Proposed strategies to address this include increasing the number of female faculty members to provide mentoring.

== Studies ==
In 2015 Harvard researcher Heather Sarsons published a paper on whether co-authored papers and the gender of the authors might affect tenure. The paper found that there was an 8% increase in the probability of a male economist getting a tenured post with a co-authored paper on their resume, but that increase was only 2% for female economists.

In 2017 Alice Wu, an undergraduate at University of California, Berkeley, published a study which used natural language processing to analyze economics job market rumors, an online forum used by academic economists to discuss job openings and candidates. The study showed that when posters on the site discussed female economists they tended to discuss the women's appearance, whereas when discussing male economists they tended to use terms emphasizing their intellectual abilities. She found two main results: first, nine of the top 10 words predictive of a post about a woman are explicitly sexual references; second, posts about women contain 43% fewer academic or professional terms and 192% more terms related to personal information or physical attributes.

In 2018 Maria-Carmen Guisan published an article in English at journal Regional and Sectoral Economic Studies (RSES), on Notable Women Economists Researchers in Spain and in the World. The journal is free downloadable at Ideas.Repec and Dialnet.

Most recently, in 2021, the evidence comes from a research study with a systematic attempt at quantitatively measuring the seminar culture within economics. They find that during a seminar, women presenters are asked more questions and the questions asked are more likely to be patronizing or hostile. This paper is the latest addition to a mounting body of evidence of gender discrimination in economics.

Similarly, in academia, where "publish or perish" is still the dominant credo, women are treated more harshly. For example, in an analysis of publications, it has been shown that men are tenured at roughly the same rate regardless of whether they co-author or solo-author. Women, however, become less likely to receive tenure the more they co-author. The result is most pronounced for women co-authoring with men, and less pronounced among women who co-author with other women.

In addition, female-authored papers took six months longer to get published, even though they are more readable than those produced by their male counterparts. This amounts to a significant time tax for female authors, and these higher standards impose a "quantity versus quality trade-off" that affects female academics' careers.

According to The American Economic Association, compared with men, women disproportionately fall off the academic ladder at the time of promotion to tenured associate – a phenomenon that appears to be unique in the economics profession.

Probably due to all of these reasons the research also shows that there is a confidence gap between men and women economists working in top U.S. universities. They find that women are still less confident than men, are less likely to give "extreme" answers in which they strongly agree or disagree, and are less confident in the accuracy of their own answers.

Committee on the Status of Women in the Economics Profession (CSWEP) provides a comprehensive annotated bibliography on research related to women in the economics profession.

According to a 2026 study in the American Economic Review, which analyzed data covering thousands of seminars, job market talks, and conference presentations, female economists were substantially more likely to be interrupted than male economists, even when controlling for factors such as presenter, paper, and audience. According to the study, "Interruptions that are negative in tenor or tone or cut off the presenter mid-sentence increase for women presenters."

== Statistics ==
The number of undergraduate women majoring in economics in the United States peaked in the mid- to late- 1990s and has decreased since then. Nationwide there are about three males for every female student majoring in economics, and this ratio has not changed for more than 20 years. Women earn the majority of undergraduate degrees across all subjects in the United States, but in 2016 only 35% of economic majors were women. This is the same percentage as the early 1980s.

In the American Economic Association's 2025 survey of U.S. doctoral economics departments, women received 35.5 percent of the PhDs granted, up from 34.2 percent in 2024.

Of the 500 doctorate degrees awarded in economics to US citizens and permanent residents in 2014 in the United States, only 157 were awarded to women.

In the United Kingdom, women make up 57% of all undergraduate students, but only 27% of students studying pure economics.

Women's participation in economics is lower than in any other social science. By many measures, the gender gap in economics is the largest of any discipline. For example, women received about 30% of doctorate and bachelor's degrees in economics in 2014, compared with 45% to 60% of degrees in business, humanities, and the STEM fields.

Women are notoriously underrepresented at the top of the economics field. Just 8 of the 140 Federal Reserve presidents appointed since 1914 have been women.

In addition, women are vastly underrepresented in Economics Nobel Prize awards; women have won a Nobel Prize 58 times, but only twice in economics, and one of the two, Elinor Ostrom, had a degree in political science.

Similarly, women are rarely selected for other prominent economics awards. For example, The John Bates Clark Medal is awarded by the American Economic Association to "that American economist under the age of forty who is adjudged to have made a significant contribution to economic thought and knowledge." This award was started in 1947, and the first time it was awarded to a woman, Susan C. Athey, was in 2007. This award has been given out 42 times, but only 5 times to women, with two of these being in the past two years (2019, 2020).

In 2020, only 22% of the National Bureau of Economic Research (NBER) affiliates were women. In 2020, for NBER Faculty Research Fellows, of those who tend to be more recent appointments and are usually untenured, there were 103 women and 195 men, with women representing 34.6%. For NBER Research Associates, of those who tend to have been appointed earlier and who all have tenure, there were 255 women and 1051 men, with women representing 19.5%.

== Strategies ==
One proposed strategy to increase the number of women in economics is to encourage mentoring relationships between female students and female faculty members. Increasing the hiring of female faculty members can be a way to also subsequently increase the number of female students. Male dominated fields might be off-putting to many female students due to biases and discrimination against women, and the presence of female professors might help mitigate this concern.

In 2017, female professors represented 12.87% of the top 20 university economic departments in Europe.

Another strategy that many American universities have taken is implementing clubs designated for women in economics. Top universities such as Harvard, Yale, and Princeton all have versions of this club. Yale University states that "The goal of the Women in Economics (WiE) organization is to support women, non-binary, and underrepresented minority students pursuing a degree in economics and to introduce more undergraduates to the field." While this club is a relatively new phenomenon across American universities, there are many other STEM clubs for women, such as the Society of Women Engineers, which have similar goals.

== Notable women in economics ==
- Edith Abbot – Helped draft the US Social Security Act of 1935.
- Anna Schwartz – Co-author of "A Monetary History of the United States 1867-1960."
- Alice Rivlin - First Chair of the US Congressional Budget Office, and Federal Reserve Vice Chair.
- Elinor Ostrom – First woman to ever win the Nobel Prize in economics. Ostrom won in 2009.
- Millicent Fawcett – Wrote Political Economy for Beginners in 1870.
- Joan Robinson – Developed the concept of monopsony, and was one of the most prominent founders of the post-Keynesian school of economic thought.
- Janet Yellen – First woman to be the chair of the Federal Reserve Bank and Secretary of the Treasury of the United States.
- Esther Duflo – 2019 laureate of the Nobel Prize in economics.
- Ann Dryden Witte – Influenced research & policy on crime & criminal justice and early care & education.
- Hundreds more Notable Women in Economics can be found through the Wikipedia Category, Women Economists.
