= Robert Rector =

American activist and research fellow

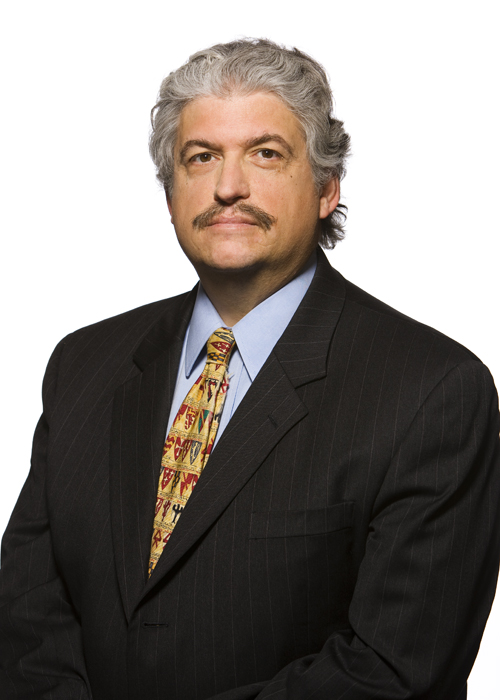
- Rector in September 2011
- Education: College of William and Mary (BA); Johns Hopkins University (MA)
- Known for: 1996 welfare reform legislative advising
- Political party: Republican

Robert E. Rector is a research fellow at The Heritage Foundation focused on poverty issues. Rector has written more than 300 reports, articles, and commentaries on public policy and has testified before Congress more than 40 times. His writings include the book America's Failed $5.4 Trillion War on Poverty.

== Education ==
Rector received an undergraduate degree from The College of William & Mary and a master's in political science from Johns Hopkins University.

== Career ==
Rector has worked for The Heritage Foundation since 1984. He is the editor of the 1987 book Steering the Elephant: How Washington Works, and the co-author of the 1995 book America's Failed $5.4 Trillion War on Poverty.

Rector has been a management analyst for the United States Office of Personnel Management and a legislative assistant in the Virginia House of Delegates. From 2001 to 2002, he served as a commissioner of the Millennial Housing Commission.

=== Welfare reform ===
Rector works on conservative poverty and welfare reform policy. He has testified before Congress and written extensively on the subject.

Rector played a major role in the design and crafting of the welfare reform legislation enacted in 1996, which marked a significant shift in American welfare policy. Early in the reform process, the Wall Street Journal called Rector the “leading guru” behind the Republican position on welfare, stating, “to understand what Republicans are trying to do about welfare, don’t look to Newt Gingrich. Watch Robert Rector.”

Rector promoted work and marriage as primary means to reduce material poverty and improve the well-being of the poor. His writing frequently expresses deep concern over the decline of marriage and rise of non-marital child bearing in low income communities and argues that dependence on welfare has harmed American society by discouraging marriage. He insists that welfare reform should seek to promote married two parent families.

Rector has written frequently on the subjects of welfare and poverty, including the 1992 The Wall Street Journal article "America's Poverty Myth", which asserted that the US Census inaccurately measures poverty, and his 1995 book with William Lauber, America's Failed $5.4 Trillion War on Poverty, which criticized welfare laws in the US for allegedly rewarding breakdowns in family values. His research has found that 99.6% of people whom the Census classifies as poor actually have access to refrigerators.

In 1995, The Wall Street Journal called Rector the "leading guru" behind the Republicans' position on welfare. In 2006, editor Rich Lowry of the conservative National Review called Rector, "the intellectual godfather" of welfare reform.

=== Immigration reform ===
Rector has been a researcher on immigration policy and has testified before Congress on the subject. In 2006, Rector published a report on the proposed Comprehensive Immigration Reform Act for The Heritage Foundation, stating that passage of the bill would lead to more than 100 million new legal immigrants within 20 years.

With statistical assistance from Harvard Ph.D. and then Heritage Research Fellow Jason Richwine, Rector wrote a report on the fiscal cost of proposed amnesty legislation to the United States. The report was published by the Heritage Foundation on May 6, 2013. Rector and Jim DeMint, a former U.S. Senator and the newly installed Heritage Foundation president, introduced the report in an op-ed article in the Washington Post.

The methods used in the report met with considerable criticism from a number of think tanks and immigration policy analysts across the political spectrum, including Alex Nowrasteh of the Cato Institute, Michael Clemens of the Center for Global Development, and many others.

Later, widespread publicity of past research by study co-author Jason Richwine on race and intelligence and race and crime in the United States, as part of his Ph.D. dissertation at Harvard University under George Borjas, led to a greater backlash against the study. Richwine left Heritage as a result of the controversy.

=== Abstinence education ===
Rector is a proponent of abstinence education. His advocacy prompted the inclusion of school-program funding for the teaching of abstinence in the Personal Responsibility and Work Opportunity Act. Rector has published research papers for The Heritage Foundation that conclude a delay in the onset of sexual activity is linked to positive life outcomes. He is quoted as an expert on abstinence education by numerous media outlets, including The New York Times. In 1999, the Los Angeles Times called Rector the "architect of the abstinence-only movement".
