= Ronald Mansbridge =

English publisher and writer (1905-2006)

- Born: Frederick Ronald Mansbridge; 11 November 1905; Sanderstead, Surrey, England
- Died: 1 September 2006 (aged 100); Weston, Connecticut, U. S.
- Occupations: Publisher, writer
- Spouse(s): Georgia Mullan (m. 1931; died 1988) Janet Van Duyn (m. 1990; died 2003)
- Children: 2, including Jane
- Relatives: Christopher Jencks (son-in-law)

Ronald Mansbridge (11 November 1905, Sanderstead – 1 September 2006, Weston) was an English publisher and writer who lived and worked in the United States. He was part of Cambridge University Press (CUP) for more than 40 years, spending most of his career establishing and building CUP's American branch. After his retirement in 1970, he briefly worked in high-level positions at MIT University Press and the Yale University Press' London office.

== Biography ==
Frederick Ronald Mansbridge was born in Sanderstead, Surrey, England, to George Frederick Mansbridge, OBE, inventor of the Mansbridge electrical condenser, and Florence Quye Mansbridge. He had two older sisters and one older brother, and traced his ancestry back to the Mansbridges whose land is shown on medieval maps of Hampshire as the Mansbridge Hundred. He was educated at Malvern College (1919–25) and Corpus Christi College, Cambridge (1925–28), where he read Classics before switching to English. His tutors at Cambridge included Arthur Quiller-Couch and I. A. Richards. Over the summer after his second year, he tutored an American girl in Latin and fell in love with her sister, prompting him to move to the United States in 1928. He taught English at Barnard College for two years while reading manuscripts for Macmillan Publishers in New York. He joined Cambridge University Press as a Macmillan representative in 1930.

Mansbridge moved his family from New York City to Weston, Connecticut in 1947 and left Macmillan two years later to establish the Cambridge University Press American Branch. Beginning with a workforce of nine, he developed the company's paperback list and worked to bring the New English Bible to the United States. On retirement, after more than 40 years with Cambridge University Press, he served briefly as Acting Director of the MIT University Press, then for two years as Managing Director of the Yale University Press office in London.

In addition to printing, Mansbridge also wrote on pacifism, Bibles (particularly the Tyndale Bible), publishing, and English usage for journals including The Book Collector, Scholarly Publishing, Publishers Weekly, The Saturday Review of Literature, English Today, and Verbatim. In 1929, he published Three Centuries of Cambridge Bibles in Publishers Weekly; the article was later included in a reprint of the commemorative book 300 Years of Printing the Authorised Version of the Holy Bible at Cambridge, 1629–1929 as a three-page end material. Beginning in 1928, he also wrote bridge columns for several publications, the last of which was a weekly column entitled "Minuteman's Bridge" for the Westport Minuteman, which he wrote until 2002. He also wrote a book of annotated limericks and a book called How to Win at Bridge Without Being an Expert, which was circulated among his friends but never published.

== Personal life ==
Mansbridge married Georgia St Clair Mullan, daughter of Justice George V. Mullan of the New York Supreme Court, on 10 April 1931 at Saint Thomas Church. They had two children: Jane Mansbridge, now Adams Professor at the John F. Kennedy School of Government at Harvard University, and Bruce Mansbridge, a psychiatrist. In 1970, Mansbridge and Georgia moved to London when he accepted the role of Managing Director at Yale University Press' UK office; they had an apartment in London and a cottage in Kent but returned to Weston two years later. In 1990, two years after the death of his first wife, Mansbridge married author Janet Dunning Van Duyn, who died in 2003. Despite living in the United States for nearly 80 years, Mansbridge never took up American citizenship. He died of natural causes aged 100 on 1 September 2006 at his home in Weston.

Mansbridge was part of the Grolier Club, the Tyndale Society, the Century Association (admitted 1947), The Baker Street Irregulars, and the American Daffodil Society. He was also part of the American Institute of Graphic Arts, of which he was elected vice-president in 1940. He was an avid bibliophile and had a sizeable collection of Cambridge University Press books printed between 1584 and 1800. It is now housed in the collection of fine books at the Waseda University Library, Tokyo.
