= Christopher Jencks =

American sociologist (1936–2025)

- Born: October 22, 1936; Baltimore, Maryland, U.S.
- Died: February 8, 2025 (aged 88); Lexington, Massachusetts, U.S.
- Education: Harvard University (A.B., M.Ed.)
- Occupation: Social scientist
- Spouse: Jane Mansbridge (m. 1976)

Christopher Sandy Jencks (October 22, 1936 – February 8, 2025) was an American social scientist.

== Background ==
Born in Baltimore on October 22, 1936, he graduated from Phillips Exeter Academy in New Hampshire in 1954 and was president of the school's newspaper, the Exonian, as a senior. After Exeter, he received an A.B. in English from Harvard in 1958, followed by a M.Ed. in Harvard Graduate School of Education. During the year 1960–1961 he studied sociology at the London School of Economics.

== Career ==
Jencks was Malcolm Wiener Professor of Social Policy in the Kennedy School of Government at Harvard University, Emeritus. He held positions at Northwestern University, the University of Chicago and the University of California at Santa Barbara.

His interests were in the study of education, social stratification, social mobility, family structure, poverty and the poor. Prior to his university career, he was an editor at The New Republic from 1961 to 1967 and a fellow of the Institute for Policy Studies in Washington, DC from 1963 to 1967. He served as an editor of The American Prospect. He published 28 essays in The New York Review of Books (https://www.nybooks.com/contributors/christopher-jencks/)and many in The New Republic.

=== Richwine controversy ===
Jencks was part of the dissertation committee at Harvard's Kennedy School that in 2009 awarded Jason Richwine – a former member of The Heritage Foundation – a PhD for his thesis, "IQ and Immigration Policy". Criticized for the way it linked race to IQ levels, the thesis lost Richwine his job at the Foundation. According to an article in The Nation by journalist and historian Jon Wiener, Jencks was "for decades a leading figure among liberals who did serious research on inequality ..." and knew exactly what was "wrong with the studies purporting to link 'race' with 'IQ'." When Wiener asked if Jencks would comment on issues involving the PhD, he replied, "Nope. But thanks for asking."

== Personal life and death ==
After two prior marriages ended in divorce, Jencks married Jane Mansbridge in 1976; they had a son. Jencks died from Alzheimer's disease at his home in Lexington, Massachusetts, on February 8, 2025, at the age of 88.

== Selected bibliography ==
- The Academic Revolution (with David Riesman, 1968, reissued 2001)
- Inequality: A Reassessment of the Effects of Family and Schooling in America (with seven co-authors, 1972)
- Who Gets Ahead? (with eleven co-authors, 1979)
- The Urban Underclass (with Paul Peterson, 1991)
- Rethinking Social Policy (1992)
- The Homeless (1994)
- The Black-White Test Score Gap (with Meredith Phillips, 1998)

== Prizes, awards and honors ==
Jencks received awards for his work on different topics within sociology. For his work with David Riesman documenting "the rise to power of professional scholars and scientists", he received the 1968 Borden Prize for Best Book on Higher Education. For his book on inequality he was the co-recipient of the 1974 Best Book in Sociology award from the American Sociological Association. For his book and articles on homelessness, he received the 1994 Best Book in Sociology and Anthropology from Association of American Publishers, and the 1995 Harry Chapin Media Award.

He also received the 1992 Willard Waller Award for lifetime achievement.

== Sources ==
- Curriculum vitae of Jencks
- Citation for Jencks on website of American Academy of Political and Social Science
- Official homepage at Harvard University
- Citation for Jencks on website of the National Academy of Sciences
- Home page, Stanford Center for Poverty and Inequality
- Membership list, National Academy of Arts and Sciences
- Postman, Neil; Weingartner, Charles (1973), The School Book, Delacorte/Seymour Lawrence
