= George J. Borjas =

American economist (born 1950)

- Born: Jorge Jesús Borjas; October 15, 1950 (age 76); Havana, Cuba
- Citizenship: American
- Education: St. Peter's College (BS; Columbia University (MA, MPhil, PhD)
- Known for: Immigration Research
- Scientific career
- Fields: Economist
- Workplaces: Harvard Kennedy School
- Thesis: Job Investment, Labor Mobility and Earnings (1975)
- Doctoral advisor: Jacob Mincer; James Heckman

George Jesus Borjas (/ˈbɔːrhɑːs/ born Jorge Jesús Borjas, October 15, 1950) is a Cuban-American economist and the Robert W. Scrivner Professor of Economics and Social Policy at the Harvard Kennedy School. He has been described as "America's leading immigration economist" and "the leading sceptic of immigration among economists". Borjas has published a number of studies that conclude that low-skilled immigration adversely affects low-skilled natives (while positively affecting medium and high skilled natives), a proposition that is debated among economists.

== Personal life and education ==
Borjas was born in Havana, Cuba, on October 15, 1950. He immigrated to the United States in October 1962 with his mother. He graduated with a B.S. in economics and mathematics from St. Peter's College in 1971. He then completed his M.A. in economics from Columbia University in 1974. He completed his M.Phil and Ph.D. in economics from Columbia University in 1975 for thesis titled Job Investment, Labor Mobility and Earnings.

He is married and has three children.

== Academic career ==
Borjas became an assistant professor of economics at Queens College, City University of New York from 1975 to 1977. He was a post-doctoral fellow at the Department of Economics, University of Chicago from 1977 to 1978. He was also a Senior Research Analyst, National Bureau of Economic Research from 1972 to 1978.

He joined the faculty at the University of California, Santa Barbara in 1980 and remained there for ten years. He then became a professor at the University of California, San Diego from 1990 to 1995. He joined the faculty at Harvard University in 1995. He is a professor of economics at Harvard University.

== Work ==
Borjas was called "America's leading immigration economist" by BusinessWeek and The Wall Street Journal. He is an influential figure in the debate on immigration and his research on the economic impact of immigration plays a central role in the debate over immigration policy in the United States.

He has written many books and has published more than 100 articles in books and scholarly journals, including the American Economic Review, the Journal of Political Economy, and the Quarterly Journal of Economics. His most recent book is We Wanted Workers: Unraveling the Immigration Narrative (W. W. Norton & Company, 2016).

With an application to the self-selection of migrants, Borjas provided the first formalization of the Roy model.

== Controversy ==
=== Jason Richwine ===
Borjas was the primary advisor to Jason Richwine, whose Harvard dissertation concluded that Latino immigrants to the U.S. are lower IQ than the US population and will remain so unless US immigration policy was adjusted to favor "selecting high-IQ immigrants." Borjas claimed that he "played no role in topic selection or forming the research agenda" for Richwine's dissertation, but some social science scholars noted it could be problematic for a dissertation advisor to fail to challenge a student's topic selection. Borjas later said that he did not "find the IQ academic work all that interesting".

=== Mariel boatlift research ===
In 2017, economist Michael Clemens argued that of Borjas' study on the effects of the Mariel boatlift concluded that Borjas' findings "may simply be spurious" and that his theory of the economic impact of the boatlift "doesn't fit the evidence." A number of other studies concluded the opposite of what Borjas' study had found.Borjas denied that he had misconstrued the data, calling the controversy "fake news." Borjas furthermore suggested that one of the economists, Michael Clemens, whose study challenged Borjas' was motivated by the political bias of "Silicon Valley" philanthropists who contribute to the Center for Global Development where Clemens works, accusing Clemens of being a paid shill of "open-borders plutocrats", and saying that "they wouldn't buy or commission research that didn't fit their priors." Nobel laureates Abhijit V. Banerjee and Esther Duflo wrote of the debate that Borjas's analysis omitted comparisons to relevant groups for no clear reason.

In August 2017, the Trump administration, while defending its plan to reduce levels of legal immigration to the United States by 50%, cited Borjas' research on the Mariel boatlift as evidence that low-skilled immigration reduced wages for American workers. Fact-checkers noted that Borjas' research on the Mariel boatlift was rebutted by other researchers and has received "major criticisms".

That same month in The Atlantic when asked about the academic community's suppression of data showing immigration's potential costs, Borjas said there's "a lot of self-censorship among young social scientists." Donald Davis, an economist and immigration advocate, responded stating, "George and I come out on different sides of policy on immigration, but I agree that there are aspects of discussion in academia that don't get sort of full view if you come to the wrong conclusion."

The extent to which immigration is a detriment or boon to the American economy continues to be hotly debated.

=== Economic Job Market Rumors forum ===
After a peer-review scandal was revealed on the website, in June 2016, Borjas praised the discourse on the Economics Job Market Rumors website as being "refreshing": "There's still hope for mankind when many of the posts written by a bunch of over-educated young social scientists illustrate a throwing off of the shackles of political correctness and reflect mundane concerns that more normal human beings share: prestige, sex, money, landing a job, sex, professional misconduct, sex..." A 2017 paper found evidence of outright hostility towards women on the website. When asked about the paper, Borjas said, "While there is some value in that forum, there is also a great deal that is offensive and disturbing. The problem is I'm not sure exactly where to draw line." According to James Bradford DeLong, "the only economics professor of any ideology or university I can recall ever praising EJMR is George Borjas."

== Political views ==
The Miami Herald describes him as "avowed conservative". According to the Miami Herald, Borjas, himself an immigrant, "supports increased restrictions on immigration, but he doesn't believe a wall — built by Mexico or anyone else — does any good. He opposes the mass deportation of undocumented immigrants as inhumane. And he advocates a tax on businesses — high-tech, agricultural and all the rest — that profit from cheaper immigrant wages, and giving that money to Americans displaced by the immigrants."

== Honors ==
Borjas was elected a fellow of the Econometric Society in 1998 and a fellow of the Society of Labor Economists in 2004. He was also a member of the Council of Economic Advisors for the Governor of California from 1993 to 1998, of the National Academy of Sciences Panel on the Demographic and Economic Impact of Immigration from 1995 to 1997, and chaired the National Science Foundation's Committee of Visitors for the Economics Program in 1996.

In 2011, he was named co-winner of the IZA Prize in Labor Economics.

== Books ==
Books written by Borjas include:

- Wage Policy in the Federal Bureaucracy (American Enterprise Institute, 1980) ISBN 9780844734101
- Friends or Strangers: The Impact of Immigrants on the U.S. Economy (Basic Books, 1990) ISBN 0465025676
- Labor Economics (McGraw-Hill, 1996; 2nd Edition, 2000, 3rd edition, 2005, 4th edition, 2008, 5th edition, 2010) ISBN 978-0078021886
- Heaven's Door: Immigration Policy and the American Economy (Princeton University Press, 1999) ISBN 978-0691088969
- Immigration Economics (Harvard University Press, 2014) ISBN 978-0674049772
- We Wanted Workers: Unraveling the Immigration Narrative (W.W. Norton & Company, 2016) ISBN 978-0393249019
