= Gallegly amendment =

1996 American amendment introduced by Elton Gallegly

The Gallegly amendment was introduced by Representative Elton Gallegly to the Illegal Immigration Reform and Immigrant Responsibility Act in 1996. Its purpose was to allow states to deny public education or charge tuition to aliens not lawfully present in the United States, despite the Supreme Court decision Plyler v. Doe barring these actions. It passed the United States House of Representatives by a margin of 257–163 but was removed from the final bill after prolonged opposition from President Bill Clinton and several Republican senators.

It was often described as the single most contentious issue of the bill and Clinton threatened a veto if it was present in the final version. While the amendment was not passed, it succeeded in dominating the agenda for several months in the summer of 1996 and may have diverted Congressional Democrats from effectively opposing other provisions. The amendment was the last serious attempt at the federal level to deny free public education to aliens not lawfully present in the United States.

== House passage and demise ==
Gallegly argued that Plyler imposed an unfunded federal mandate on the states. "Come to America for opportunity. Do not come to America to live off the law-abiding American taxpayer," he said. Emotions ran high during early House debate: Representative Gary Ackerman (D-NY) commented, "After I got over my initial reaction, I decided not to go out and commit any crimes of violence," with other Democrats describing the amendment as "hideous." Nevertheless, the amendment was supported by Speaker Newt Gingrich, who stated, "There is no question that offering free taxpayer goods to illegals attracts more illegals...It is wrong for us to be the welfare capital of the world." In comparison, Gingrich had not favored a full federal version of Proposition 187 during its passage, which was a complete ban and contained no option of merely charging tuition. The amendment was also supported by Senate Majority Leader Bob Dole, who welcomed the prospect of a veto by President Clinton that would demonstrate that Clinton was not serious about immigration reform and aid Dole's run for president. Dole stated the amendment would free up $1.8 billion and allow either the hiring of 51,000 new teachers or the purchase of 3.6 million new school computers.

The Gallegly amendment was generally not well received by public school teachers and officials. This was the case even in the Tyler, Texas school system, which had fought and lost the original Plyler case more than a decade before. A more recent poll from Arizona put support for Plyler at 76% among public school teachers.) Several teachers unions said they would refuse to enforce the amendment. The International Union of Police Associations also opposed it, saying it would increase crime and cause illegal alien children to become both "victims and criminals." At the legislative level, Texas Republican senators Phil Gramm and Kay Bailey Hutchison opposed the amendment. Five Republican senators publicly expressed disapproval by sending a letter to Presidential candidate Bob Dole calling the amendment "highly controversial and ill-advised." Up to a dozen Republican senators may have been opposed.

The death of the amendment in conference was the result of exclusively Republican negotiations, the agreed-upon strategy being that Republicans would negotiate first among themselves and then present a united front to the Democrats. Orrin Hatch (R-UT) and Arlen Specter (R-PA) were on the conference committee to merge the House and Senate bills and had previously opposed the amendment. They initially agreed to a compromise that would apply only to children entering public schools after September 1996. But after Senator Dianne Feinstein (D-CA), and some California congressional Republicans turned against the amendment, and even Proposition 187 architect Ron Prince made clear he was afraid it would kill the bill, conference negotiators Representative Lamar Smith (R-TX) and Senator Alan Simpson (R-WY) began to share Prince's fear. Eventually lobbying against it, Simpson stated that the public did not support the amendment and that "If the national interest is subverted by Machiavellian mumbo jumbo, I'm not going to play that game." Threatened with enough Republican opposition to allow a filibuster in the Senate, the Republican leadership eventually blocked both the original amendment and any compromise from making it into the final bill.
