= Plyler v. Doe =

- Supreme Court of the United States

Argued December 1, 1981 Decided June 15, 1982
- Full case name: James Plyler, Superintendent, Tyler Independent School District and Its Board of Trustees, et al. v. John Doe, et al.; Texas, et al. v. Certain named and undocumented alien children, et al.
- Citations: 457 U.S. 202 (more) 102 S. Ct. 2382; 72 L. Ed. 2d 786; 1982 U.S. LEXIS 124; 50 U.S.L.W. 4650
- Argument: Oral argument

Case history
- Prior: Judgment for plaintiffs, 458 F. Supp. 569 (E.D. Tex. 1978); affirmed, 628 F.2d 448 (5th Cir. 1980)
- Subsequent: Rehearing denied, 458 U.S. 1131 (1982)

Holding
- Denial of public education to students not legally admitted into the country violates the Equal Protection Clause. Court of Appeals for the Fifth Circuit affirmed.

Court membership
- Chief Justice Warren E. Burger Associate Justices William J. Brennan Jr. · Byron White; Thurgood Marshall · Harry Blackmun; Lewis F. Powell Jr. · William Rehnquist; John P. Stevens · Sandra Day O'Connor

Case opinions
- Majority: Brennan, joined by Marshall, Blackmun, Powell, Stevens
- Concurrence: Marshall
- Concurrence: Blackmun
- Concurrence: Powell
- Dissent: Burger, joined by White, Rehnquist, O'Connor

Laws applied
- U.S. Const. amend. XIV; Tex. Educ. Code Ann. § 21.031

Plyler v. Doe, 457 U.S. 202 (1982), is a landmark decision in which the Supreme Court of the United States struck down both a state statute denying funding for education of undocumented immigrant children in the United States and an independent school district's attempt to charge an annual $1,000 tuition fee for each student to compensate for lost state funding. The Court found that any state restriction imposed on the rights afforded to children based on their immigration status must be examined under an intermediate scrutiny standard to determine whether it furthers a substantial government interest.

The application of Plyler v. Doe has been limited to K–12 schooling. Other cases and legislation such as Toll v. Moreno 441 U.S. 458 (1979) and the Illegal Immigration Reform and Immigrant Responsibility Act of 1996 have allowed some states to pass statutes that deny undocumented students eligibility for in-state tuition, scholarships, or enrollment at public colleges and universities.

== History ==
In 1975 Texas "prohibited the use of state funds for the education of children who had not been legally admitted to the U.S" (457 U.S.202). The state policy also allowed schools to deny enrollment of any "unauthorized" child seeking to attend the school. Then in 1977, the Tyler Independent School District instituted a policy mandating that foreign-born students who were not considered to be legally admitted to the United States were required to pay tuition. "Under the school district's policy, children were considered "legally admitted" if (1) they possessed documentation showing that they were legally present in the United States, or (2) federal immigration authorities confirmed they were in the process of securing such documentation."

== Summary ==
Revisions to education laws in Texas in 1975 withheld state funds for educating children who had not been legally admitted to the United States and authorized local school districts to deny enrollment to such students. A 5–4 majority of the Supreme Court found the policy to violate the Fourteenth Amendment, as undocumented children are people "in any ordinary sense of the term" and therefore had protection from discrimination unless a substantial state interest could be shown to justify it.

The majority found that the Texas law was "directed against children, and impose[d] its discriminatory burden on the basis of a legal characteristic over which children can have little control". The majority also observed that denying the children in question a proper education would likely contribute to "the creation and perpetuation of a subclass of illiterates within our boundaries, surely adding to the problems and costs of unemployment, welfare, and crime". The majority did not find that any substantial state interest would be advanced by discrimination on that basis and so struck down the Texas law.

Texas officials had argued that illegal aliens were not "within the jurisdiction" of the state and thus could not claim protections under the Fourteenth Amendment. The majority rejected that claim and found that "no plausible distinction with respect to Fourteenth Amendment 'jurisdiction' can be drawn between resident immigrants whose entry into the United States was lawful, and resident immigrants whose entry was unlawful".

In short, the most prominent takeaways from this case were that the Court reasoned that unauthorized immigrants and their children, although not citizens of the United States or Texas, are people "in any ordinary sense of the term" and, therefore, are afforded Fourteenth Amendment protections. Since the state law severely disadvantaged the children of illegal aliens by denying them the right to an education, and because Texas could not prove that the regulation was needed to serve a "compelling state interest," the Court struck down the law.

== Concurring opinions ==
Three of the four justices who joined the majority opinion written by Justice Brennan wrote their own concurring opinions.

Justice Marshall called specific attention to his belief that the interest of an individual to pursue an education is fundamental, and that "this belief is amply supported by the unique status accorded public education by our society, and by the close relationship between education and some of our most basic constitutional values."

Justice Blackmun noted that "when a state provides an education to some and denies it to others, it immediately and inevitably creates class distinctions of a type fundamentally inconsistent with" the purposes of the Equal Protection Clause because "an uneducated child is denied even the opportunity to achieve." When those children are members of an identifiable class, the state has created a separable and identifiable underclass."

Justice Powell noted the uniqueness of this particular case. He highlighted that as long as this law stands a group of children is being denied access to education, not due to actions of their own, but because of a violation of the law by their parents. "A legislative classification that threatens the creation of an underclass of future citizens and residents cannot be reconciled with one of the fundamental purposes of the Fourteenth Amendment."

== Dissenting opinion ==
Chief Justice Burger, joined by Justices White, Rehnquist, and O'Connor, wrote a dissenting opinion.

The four dissenting justices all agreed with the majority that it would be wrong to "tolerate creation of a segment of society made up of illiterate persons". The dissenting opinion also agreed that "the Equal Protection Clause of the Fourteenth Amendment applies to immigrants who, after their illegal entry into this country, are indeed physically 'within the jurisdiction' of a state". However, in his dissent, Chief Justice Burger asserted that issues of whether or not to admit children of undocumented immigrants should be delegated to Congress and not the judiciary, as it is more a policy issue than a constitutional one. Burger further argued that the "Equal Protection Clause does not mandate identical treatment of different categories of persons" and that Texas did in fact have a legitimate reason to seek to distinguish between individuals who were residing in the country legally versus illegally.

William Rehnquist was so disgusted by the decision that he referred to undocumented children as "wetbacks" in conference, which angered Thurgood Marshall.

This case was decided together with Texas v. Certain Named and Unnamed Alien Children.

== Subsequent developments ==
As of 2012, the issue in this case had not been re-litigated by the Supreme Court, but it was frequently cited in litigation before lower courts.

In May 2022 Texas Governor Greg Abbott expressed interest in attempting to overturn the case, following the leak of the draft opinion in Dobbs v. Jackson Women's Health Organization. The draft opinion, written by Justice Samuel Alito, would overturn Roe v. Wade on the basis that abortion rights were not explicitly protected in the Constitution and thus would allow states to determine whether to protect or restrict those rights. Abbott stated the same would apply to the rights to education for immigrants, which is only established by Plyler and not a constitutional right.

In 2025, legislation was introduced in the Tennessee General Assembly that seeks to challenge the case. Supporters of the legislation stated that they believed that the case was wrongly decided and that the current Supreme Court would be likely to revisit and overturn the case.

== See also ==
- Gallegly amendment
- List of United States Supreme Court cases, volume 457
