= Jane Mansbridge =

American political scientist (born 1939)

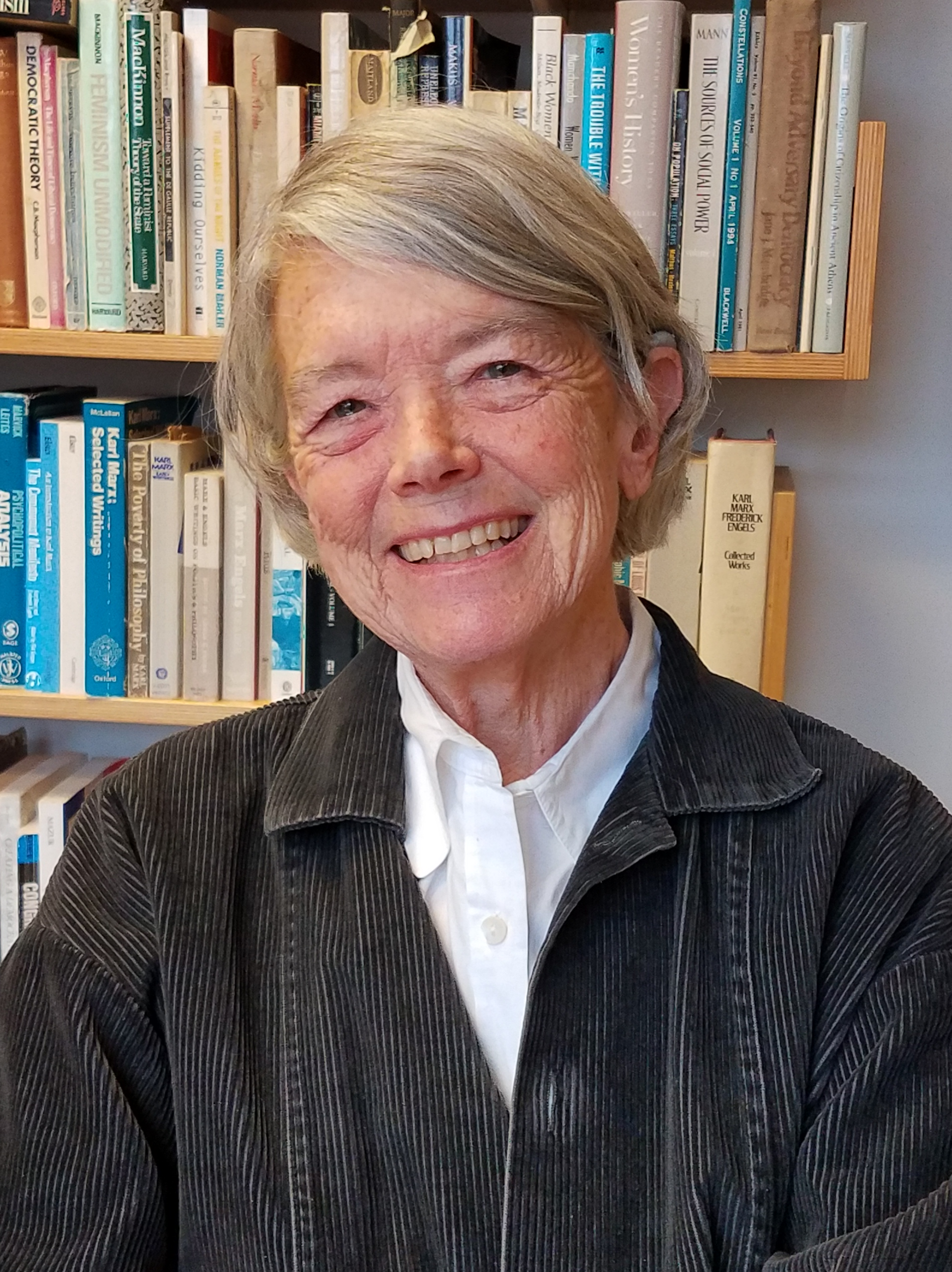
- Mansbridge in 2017
- Born: November 19, 1939 (age 86); New York City, U.S.
- Awards: Johan Skytte Prize in Political Science (2018)

Education
- Education: Wellesley College (BA); Harvard University (MA, PhD)

Philosophical work
- Institutions: Malcolm Wiener Center for Social Policy, Harvard Kennedy School
- Website: Harvard profile

Jane Jebb Mansbridge (born November 19, 1939) is an American political scientist. She is the Charles F. Adams Professor of Political Leadership and Democratic Values in the Kennedy School of Government at Harvard University.

Mansbridge has made contributions to democratic theory, feminist scholarship, and the empirical study of social movements and direct democracy.

In April 2018, Mansbridge was announced to be the 24th laureate of the Johan Skytte Prize in Political Science.

== Early life and education ==
Mansbridge received her B.A. from Wellesley College in 1961, her M.A. in history from Harvard University in 1966, and her Ph.D. in government from Harvard in 1971. Her father was the publisher and writer Ronald Mansbridge.

== Career ==
Mansbridge previously taught at the University of Chicago and Northwestern University.

Mansbridge is particularly known for the distinction between unitary and adversary democracy (based on common and conflicting interests respectively), and for her concepts of gyroscopic representation (based on inner motivation), the selection model of representation, and surrogate representation (representation of others outside one's district). She is currently working on the necessity for legitimate coercion created by our need for "free use" (or "free access") goods.

Her first husband was Owen De Long. She was married to sociologist Christopher Jencks from 1976 to his death in 2025.

== Prizes, awards and honors ==
- 1971–1972: National Science Foundation Postdoctoral Fellow.
- 1982–1983: Rockefeller Foundation Humanities Fellow.
- 1985–1986: Institute for Advanced Study, Member.
- 1987: Co-recipient, APSA Kammerer Award.
- 1988: Co-recipient, APSA Schuck Award.
- 1991–1992: Russell Sage Foundation, visiting scholar.
- 1994: Elected member, American Academy of Arts and Sciences.
- 1997–1998, 2001–2002: Center for Advanced Study in the Behavioral Sciences, Fellow.
- 1998: Jane Mansbridge Scholar-Activist Award created, Northwestern University.
- 2004: Radcliffe Graduate Society Medal.
- 2005: Jane Mansbridge Research Paper Award (annual) created, Women and Public Policy Program, Kennedy School, Harvard University.
- 2004–2005: Radcliffe Institute for Advanced Study, Fellow 2004–2005.
- 2010: Midwest Women's Caucus for Political Science Outstanding Professional Achievement Award.
- 2011: APSA James Madison Award.
- 2012–2013: American Political Science Association President.
- 2014: elected a Corresponding Fellow of the British Academy.
- 2017: Received a honoris causa doctorate by the French university Sciences Po. The ceremony took place December 12.
- 2018: Johan Skytte Prize in Political Science
- 2021: Karl Deutsch Award

== Bibliography ==
=== Books ===
- Mansbridge, Jane J (1980). Beyond adversary democracy. Chicago: University of Chicago Press. ISBN 978-0-226-50355-4.
- Mansbridge, Jane J (1986). Why we lost the ERA (Equal Rights Amendment). Chicago: University of Chicago Press. ISBN 978-0-226-50357-8.
- Mansbridge, Jane J, ed. (1990). Beyond self-interest. Chicago: University of Chicago Press. ISBN 978-0-226-50360-8.
- Mansbridge, Jane J; Parkinson, John, eds. (2012). Deliberative systems. Cambridge: Cambridge University Press. ISBN 978-1-107-02539-4.
- Mansbridge, Jane J; Martin, Cathie Jo, eds. (2014). Negotiating agreement in politics. Washington, D.C.: American Political Science Association. ISBN 978-1-878147-47-9.

=== Chapters in books ===
- Mansbridge, Jane J (1993), "Feminism and democratic community", in Chapman, John W; Shapiro, Ian (eds.), Democratic Community: NOMOS XXXV, vol. 35, New York: New York University Press, pp. 342–377, ISBN 978-0-8147-1507-9
- Mansbridge, Jane J (1996), "Using power/fighting power: the polity", in Benhabib, Seyla (ed.), Democracy and Difference, Princeton: Princeton University Press, pp. 46–56, ISBN 978-0-19-513199-4
- Mansbridge, Jane J (1999), "Everyday talk in the deliberative system", in Macedo, Steven (ed.), Deliberative Politics, Oxford: Oxford University Press, pp. 211–239, ISBN 978-0-691-04478-1
- Mansbridge, Jane J (1999), "On the idea that participation makes better citizens", in Elkin, Stephen L; Soltan, Karol E (eds.), Citizen Competence and Democratic Institutions, University Park: Pennsylvania State University Press, pp. 295–325, ISBN 978-0-271-03018-0
- Mansbridge, Jane J (2001), "A 'moral core' solution to the prisoners' dilemma", in Scott, Joan W; Keates, Debra (eds.), Schools of thought: twenty-five years of interpretive social science, Princeton: Princeton University Press, pp. 330–347, ISBN 978-0-691-08842-6
- Mansbridge, Jane J (2009), "On the free rider problem", in King, Gary; Schlozman, Kay L; Nie, Norman H (eds.), The future of political science: 100 perspectives, New York: Routledge, pp. 217–219, ISBN 978-0-415-99701-0
- Mansbridge, Jane J; Bohman, James; Chambers, Simone; Christiano, Thomas; et al. (2012), "A systematic approach to democratic deliberation", in Parkinson, John; Mansbridge, Jane J (eds.), Deliberative Systems, Cambridge: Cambridge University Press, pp. 1–26, ISBN 978-1-107-02539-4
- Mansbridge, Jane J (2014), "Helping congress negotiate", in Persily, Nathaniel (ed.), Solutions to Political Polarization in America, Cambridge: Cambridge University Press, pp. 262–274, ISBN 978-1-107-45191-9
- Mansbridge, Jane J (2014), "A contingency theory of accountability", in Bowens, Mark; Goodin, Robert E; Schillemans, Thomas (eds.), The Oxford Handbook of Public Accountability, Oxford: Oxford University Press, pp. 55–68, ISBN 978-0-19-877847-9
- Mansbridge, Jane J; Warren, Mark E; et al. (2015), "Deliberative negotiation", in Mansbridge, Jane J; Martin, Cathie J (eds.), Political Negotiation: A Handbook, Washington DC: Brookings, pp. 141–198, ISBN 978-0-8157-2729-3

=== Journal articles ===
- Mansbridge, Jane (July 1977). "Acceptable inequalities". British Journal of Political Science. 7 (3): 321–336. doi:10.1017/S0007123400001010.
- Mansbridge, Jane (Summer 1985). "Myth and reality: the ERA and the gender gap in the 1980 election". Public Opinion Quarterly. 49 (2): 164–178. doi:10.1086/268912.
- Mansbridge, Jane; Tate, Katherine (September 1992). "Race trumps gender: the Thomas nomination in the black community". PS: Political Science & Politics. 25 (3): 488–492. doi:10.2307/419439. JSTOR 419439. S2CID 155019027.
- Mansbridge, Jane (March 1995). "Rational choice gains by losing". Political Psychology. 16 (1): 137–155. doi:10.2307/3791453. JSTOR 3791453.
- Mansbridge, Jane (August 1999). "Should blacks represent blacks and women represent women? A contingent "yes"". The Journal of Politics. 61 (3): 628–657. doi:10.2307/2647821. JSTOR 2647821. S2CID 37133536.
- Mansbridge, Jane; Flaster, Katherine (2005). "Male chauvinist, feminist, sexist, and sexual harassment: different trajectories in feminist linguistic innovation". American Speech. 80 (3): 256–279. doi:10.1215/00031283-80-3-256. Pdf.
- Mansbridge, Jane (September 2005). "Cracking through hegemonic ideology: the logic of formal justice". Social Justice Research. 18 (3): 335–347. doi:10.1007/s11211-005-6828-0. S2CID 143999366.
- Mansbridge, Jane (December 2005). "Quota problems: combating the dangers of essentialism". Politics & Gender. 1 (4): 622–638. doi:10.1017/S1743923X05220196. S2CID 143605326.
- Mansbridge, Jane (Winter 2007). "Self-interest in deliberation". Kettering Review. 25 (2): 62–72. Archived from the original on 2014-04-18. PDF version.
- Mansbridge, Jane; Shames, Shauna L (December 2008). "Toward a theory of backlash: dynamic resistance and the central role of power". Politics & Gender. 4 (4): 623–634. doi:10.1017/S1743923X08000500. S2CID 13814344.
- Mansbridge, Jane (March 2014). "What is political science for?". Perspectives on Politics. 12 (1): 8–17. doi:10.1017/S153759271300368X. S2CID 154424952.
