= Jason Richwine =

American political commentator and author

- Born: April 21, 1982 (age 44); Philadelphia, Pennsylvania, U.S.
- Occupations: Political commentator, author

Academic background
- Education: American University (BS, BA); Harvard University (PhD)
- Thesis: IQ and Immigration Policy (2009)
- Doctoral advisor: George J. Borjas
- Website: www.jasonrichwine.com

Jason Matthew Richwine (born April 21, 1982) is an American political commentator and author. He is best known for his doctoral dissertation titled "IQ and Immigration Policy," and a report he co-authored for The Heritage Foundation on the economic costs of illegal immigration to the United States which concluded that passing the Border Security, Economic Opportunity, and Immigration Modernization Act of 2013 would cost taxpayers more than $6 trillion.

== Early life and education ==
Richwine was born April 21, 1982, in Philadelphia. He attended American University in Washington, D.C., where he received both a Bachelor of Science in mathematics and Bachelor of Arts in political science in 2004. He then attended Harvard University, where he received his PhD in 2009 in public policy, where he authored a dissertation titled "IQ and Immigration Policy".

In part of his dissertation, Richwine claimed that Hispanic immigrants to America had a lower average IQ than non-Hispanic whites, and that this disparity persisted for several generations, but he ultimately called for a race-neutral policy of selecting high-IQ immigrants. The dissertation committee was composed of economist Richard Zeckhauser, economist George Borjas, and Christopher Jencks, the social scientist and editor of The American Prospect. Richwine subsequently wrote an article for Politico defending his dissertation and arguing that the statements it contained about ethnic differences in IQ were "scientifically unremarkable".

== Career ==
After obtaining his Ph.D. from Harvard, Richwine worked briefly at the American Enterprise Institute; while there, he wrote a book review for The American Conservative criticizing Richard E. Nisbett's book Intelligence and How to Get It. In 2010, as the online magazine AlternativeRight.com was first starting up, he wrote two pieces about immigration and crime for it in response to a Ron Unz essay covering the same topic in The American Conservative.

He later joined The Heritage Foundation, where he co-authored a study on the costs of illegal immigration. Following the study's release, Dylan Matthews, a reporter for The Washington Post found Richwine's dissertation and wrote a blog post about it on May 8, 2013. Richwine argued that Hispanics and blacks have a lower average IQ than whites, partially for genetic reasons, and that they have trouble assimilating as a result. Richwine resigned from the Foundation on May 10, 2013.

As of 2017, Richwine had contributed on occasion to National Review. He continued his controversial research, and published an article in the American Affairs, titled "Low-Skill Immigration: A Case for Restriction".

Richwine joined The Heritage Foundation in 2009 after he receiving his PhD in public policy from Harvard University. In his thesis, titled, "IQ and Immigration Policy" he wrote:

"No one knows whether Hispanics will ever reach IQ parity with whites, but the prediction that new Hispanic immigrants will have low-IQ children and grandchildren is difficult to argue against.

"the totality of the evidence suggests a genetic component to group differences in IQ, but the extent of its impact is hard to determine.

"The statistical construct known as IQ can reliably estimate general mental ability, or intelligence. The average IQ of immigrants in the United States is substantially lower than that of the white native population, and the difference is likely to persist over several generations. The consequences are a lack of socioeconomic assimilation among low-IQ immigrant groups, more underclass behavior, less social trust, and an increase in the proportion of unskilled workers in the American labor market."

In a later work for The Heritage Foundation released in 2013, Richwine and co-author Robert Rector wrote that the immigration reform bill then being weighed in the U.S. Senate would cost the government $5.3 trillion.

On May 6, 2013, Dylan Matthews wrote for The Washington Post that, "The study represents the most notable attack on the reform effort to date from a conservative group ... So does the Heritage estimate hold up? Not really. They make a lot of curious methodological choices that cumulatively throw the study into question. It's likely that immigrants would pay a lot more in taxes, and need a lot less in benefits, than Heritage assumes, and that other benefits would outweigh what costs remain."

During the lame duck period of the Trump administration, Trump appointed Richwine deputy director of the National Institute of Standards and Technology.
