= The Heritage Foundation =

American conservative think tank

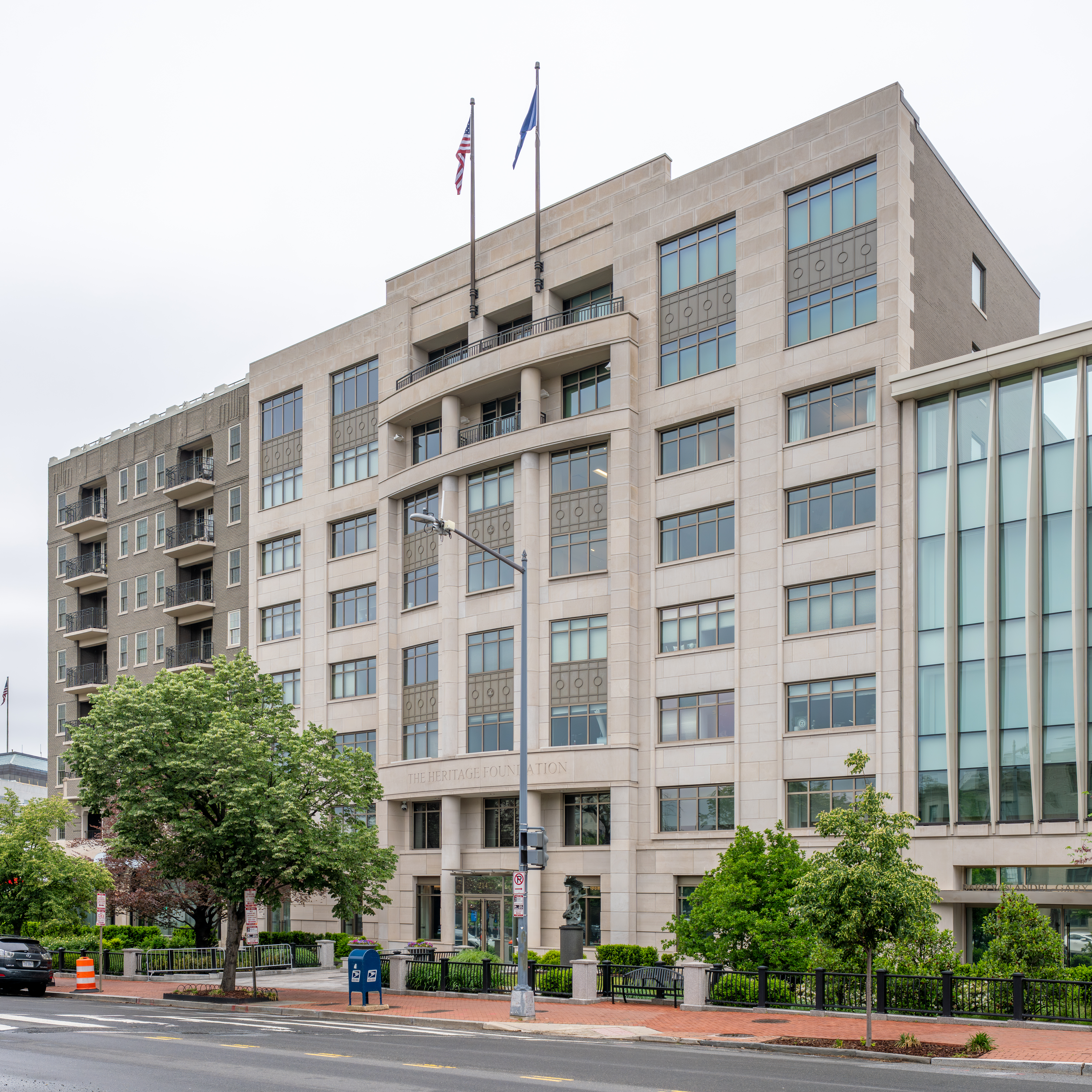
- Headquarters in Washington, D.C.
- Abbreviation: Heritage
- Formation: February 16, 1973 (53 years ago)
- Type: Nonprofit
- Tax ID no.: 23-7327730 (EIN)
- Legal status: 501(c)(3)
- Headquarters: 214 Massachusetts Avenue NE, Washington, D.C., U.S.
- Location: Washington, D.C., U.S.
- President: Kevin D. Roberts
- Chair: Barbara Van Andel-Gaby
- Revenue: US$134 million (2024)
- Expenses: US$142 million (2024)
- Website: www.heritage.org

The Heritage Foundation (or simply Heritage) is an American right-wing think tank based in Washington, D.C. Founded in 1973, it took a leading role in the conservative movement in the 1980s during the presidency of Ronald Reagan, whose policies were taken from Heritage Foundation studies, including its Mandate for Leadership.

The Heritage Foundation has had significant influence in U.S. public policy making, and has historically been ranked among the most influential public policy organizations in the United States. In 2010, it founded a sister organization, Heritage Action, an influential activist force in conservative and Republican politics.

Heritage led Project 2025, also known as the 2025 Presidential Transition Project, an extensive plan that includes appointing ideologically aligned civil servants, restricting abortion access, opposing LGBTQ+ rights, transforming federal agencies for political purposes, and imposing strict immigration policies. It also leads Project Esther, a plan to suppress pro-Palestinian protests, especially at university campuses.

== History ==
=== Early years ===
The foundation was established on February 16, 1973, during the Nixon administration by Paul Weyrich, Edwin Feulner, and Joseph Coors. Growing out of the new business activist movement inspired by the Powell Memorandum, Weyrich and Feulner sought to create a conservative version of the Brookings Institution that advanced conservative policies.

Coors was Heritage's earliest funding source, seeding the organization with an initial $250,000. Billionaire Richard Mellon Scaife followed up a year later, using the Scaife Family Charitable Trust to donate tens of millions to the foundation over the next two decades as its primary donor. Weyrich was the foundation's first president. Under Weyrich's successor, Frank J. Walton, the Heritage Foundation began using direct mail fundraising, which contributed to the growth of its annual income, which reached $1 million in 1976. By 1981, the annual budget was $5.3 million.

The foundation advocated pro-business policies and anti-communism in its early years, but distinguished itself from the American Enterprise Institute (AEI) by also advocating for cultural issues important to Christian conservatives. But throughout the 1970s, the Heritage Foundation remained small relative to Brookings and AEI.

=== Reagan administration ===
In January 1981, the Heritage Foundation published Mandate for Leadership, a comprehensive report aimed at reducing the size of the federal government. It provided public policy guidance to the incoming Reagan administration, and included over 2,000 specific policy recommendations for the Reagan administration to use the federal government to advance conservative policies. The report was well received by the White House, and several of its authors went on to take positions in the Reagan administration. Ronald Reagan liked the ideas so much that he gave a copy to each member of his cabinet to review. About 60% of the 2,000 Heritage proposals were implemented or initiated by the end of Reagan's first year in office. Reagan later called the Heritage Foundation a "vital force" during his presidency.

The foundation was influential in developing and advancing the Reagan Doctrine, a key Reagan administration foreign policy initiative under which the U.S. began providing military and other support to anti-communist resistance movements fighting Soviet-aligned governments in Afghanistan, Angola, Cambodia, Nicaragua, and other nations during the final years of the Cold War.

After Reagan met with Mikhail Gorbachev in Moscow in the 1980s, The Wall Street Journal reported, "the Soviet leader offered a complaint: Reagan was influenced by the Heritage Foundation, Washington's conservative think tank. The outfit lent intellectual energy to the Gipper’s agenda, including the Reagan Doctrine—the idea that America should support insurgents resisting communist domination."

The foundation also supported the development of a new ballistic missile defense system for the United States. In 1983, Reagan made the development of this new defense system, known as the Strategic Defense Initiative, his top defense priority.

By mid-decade, the Heritage Foundation emerged as a key organization in the national conservative movement, publishing influential reports on a broad range of policy issues by prominent conservative thought leaders. In 1986, in recognition of the Heritage Foundation's fast-growing influence, Time magazine called the Heritage Foundation "the foremost of the new breed of advocacy tanks". It served as the brain trust on foreign policy for the Reagan and George H. W. Bush administrations.

=== George H. W. Bush administration ===
The foundation remained an influential voice on domestic and foreign policy issues during President George H. W. Bush's administration. In 1990 and 1991, the foundation was a leading proponent of Operation Desert Storm designed to liberate Kuwait following Saddam Hussein's invasion and occupation of Kuwait in August 1990. According to Baltimore Sun Washington bureau chief Frank Starr, the Heritage Foundation's studies "laid much of the groundwork for Bush administration thinking" about post-Soviet foreign policy.

=== Clinton administration ===
The foundation continued to grow throughout the 1990s. The foundation's flagship journal, Policy Review, reached a circulation of 23,000. In 1993, Heritage was an opponent of the Clinton health care plan, which died in the U.S. Senate the following year, in August 1994.

In the 1994 congressional elections, Republicans took control of the House of Representatives, and Newt Gingrich was elected as the new House Speaker in January 1995, largely based on commitments made in the Contract with America, which was issued six weeks prior to the 1994 elections. The contract was a pact of principles that directly challenged the political status quo in Washington, D.C. and many of the ideas at the heart of the Clinton administration.

In 1994, the foundation published The Index of Leading Cultural Indicators by William Bennett, arguing that crime, illegitimacy, divorce, teenage suicide, drug use, and 14 other social indicators had worsened since the 1960s.

In 1995, the Heritage Foundation published its first Index of Economic Freedom, an annual publication that assesses the state of economic freedom in every country in the world; two years later, in 1997, The Wall Street Journal joined the project as a co-manager and co-author of the annual publication.

In 1996, Clinton aligned some of his welfare reforms with the Heritage Foundation's recommendations, incorporating them into the Personal Responsibility and Work Opportunity Act.

=== George W. Bush administration ===
Following the September 11 attacks in 2001, the Heritage Foundation supported the wars in Afghanistan and Iraq in the war on terror. The foundation challenged opposition to the war. They defended the George W. Bush administration's treatment of suspected terrorists at Guantanamo Bay.

In April 2005, The Washington Post reported that the Heritage Foundation softened its criticism of the Malaysian government after Heritage Foundation president Edwin Feulner initiated a business relationship with Malaysian prime minister Mahathir Mohamad. "Heritage's new, pro-Malaysian outlook emerged at the same time a Hong Kong consulting firm co-founded by Edwin J. Feulner, Heritage's president, began representing Malaysian business interests" through his relationship with Belle Haven Consultants. The foundation denied a conflict of interest, saying that its views on Malaysia changed following the country's cooperation with the U.S. after the September 11 attacks, and the Malaysian government "moving in the right economic and political direction."

=== Obama administration ===
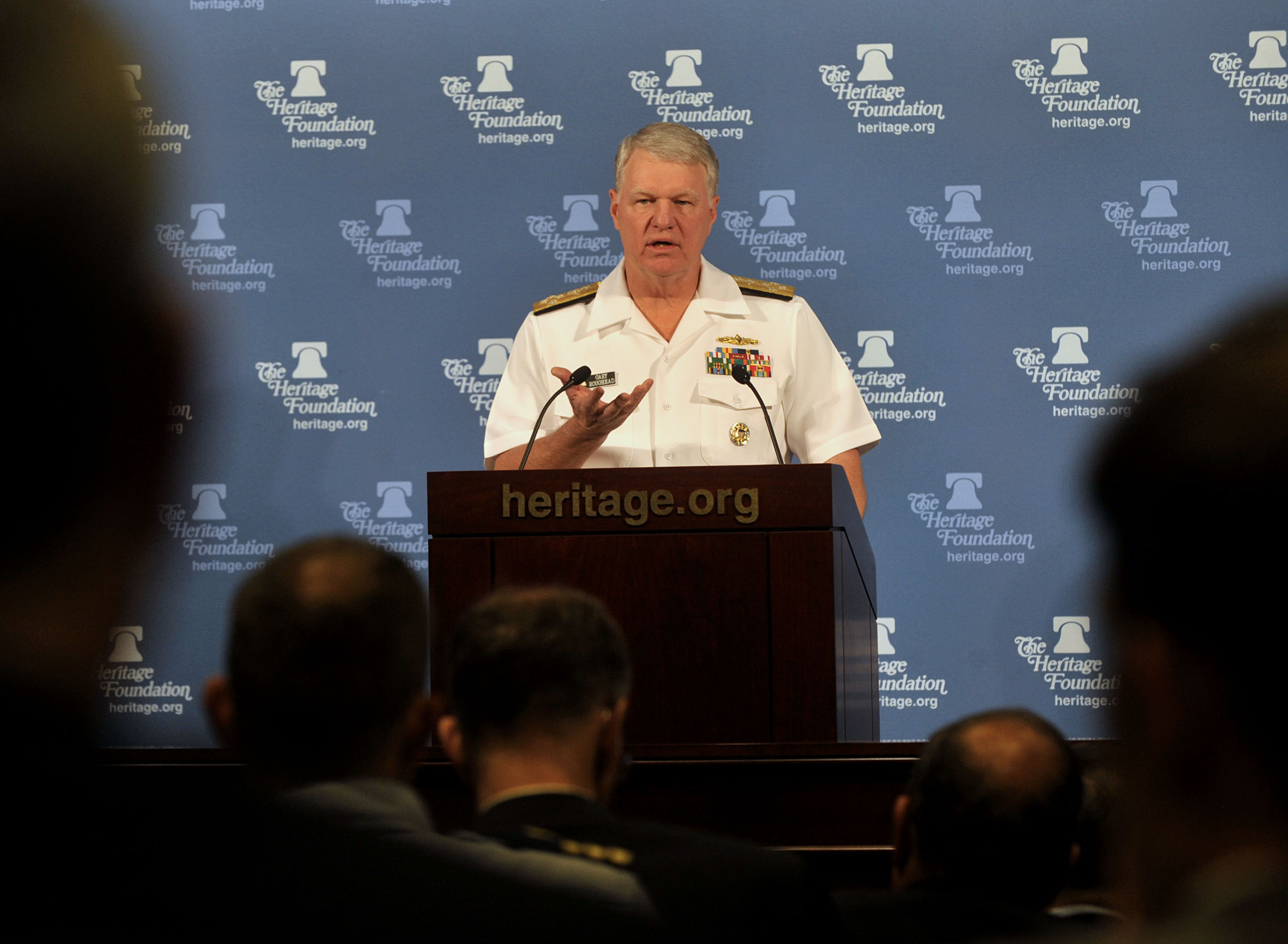
Chief of Naval Operations Admiral Gary Roughead speaking at the Heritage Foundation in May 2010

In March 2010, the Obama administration introduced a health insurance mandate in the Affordable Care Act (ACA), also known as Obamacare, which the foundation supported in its October 1989 study, "Assuring Affordable Health Care for All Americans". In 2006, the mandate proposed in the Heritage Foundation study was incorporated into Massachusetts governor Mitt Romney's health care plan, known as "Romneycare," for Massachusetts. The foundation subsequently opposed the Affordable Care Act.

In April 2010, partly inspired by the model of the Center for American Progress Action Fund, founded by the progressive Center for American Progress, the foundation launched Heritage Action as a sister 501(c)4 organization designed to expand Heritage's political influence and reach. The new group quickly became influential.

In July 2011, the Heritage Foundation published a widely criticized study on poverty in the United States, which was denounced by The New Republic, The Nation, the Center for American Progress, and The Washington Post.

In December 2012, Jim DeMint, then a U.S. senator from South Carolina, resigned from the Senate to replace Feulner as the foundation's president. As Heritage Foundation president, DeMint was paid $1 million annually, making him the highest-paid think tank president in Washington, D.C., at the time. It was predicted that he would introduce a sharper, more politicized edge. DeMint led changes to a long-standing process for the publication of policy papers, which had been authored by policy experts and then reviewed by senior staff members. Under DeMint, policy papers were heavily edited and sometimes shelved entirely. This led several scholars affiliated with the foundation to resign.

In May 2013, Jason Richwine, a senior fellow at the foundation, resigned after his Harvard University Ph.D. thesis, authored in 2009, and comments he made at a 2008 American Enterprise Institute forum, drew extensive media scrutiny. In his thesis and at in the earlier American Enterprise Institute forum, Richwine argued that Hispanics and Blacks are intellectually inferior to whites with a supposed predisposition to lower IQs, leading them to struggle in assimilating. A foundation study that month by Richwine and Robert Rector also was widely criticized across the political spectrum for methodology the two used in criticizing immigration reform legislation. Reason magazine and the Cato Institute criticized it for failing to employ dynamic scoring, which Heritage previously incorporated in analyzing other policy proposals.

In July 2013, following disputes with the Heritage Foundation over the farm bill, the Republican Study Committee, which then included 172 conservative U.S. House members, reversed a decades-old tradition and barred Heritage employees from attending its weekly meeting in the U.S. Capitol, though it continued cooperating with the foundation through "regular joint events and briefings".

==== 2015 cyberattack ====
In September 2015, the Heritage Foundation announced that it had been targeted by hackers, which resulted in the theft of donors' information stored in its systems. The Hill, a Washington, D.C.–based newspaper covering politics, compared the cyberattack on the foundation to a similar one against the U.S. Office of Personnel Management several months earlier by China's Jiangsu State Security Department, a subsidiary of the Ministry of State Security spy agency, which accessed security clearance information on millions of federal government employees. After announcing the hacking, the foundation released no further information about it.

=== 2016 Trump candidacy ===
In June 2015, Donald Trump announced his candidacy for the 2016 Republican presidential nomination. In July 2015, appearing on a Fox News panel, Michael Needham, leader of Heritage Action, the foundation's advocacy arm, said, "Donald Trump's a clown. He needs to be out of the race."

The following month, in August, a Heritage Foundation economic writer, Stephen Moore, criticized Trump's policy positions, saying, "the problem for Trump is that he’s full of all of these contradictions. He’s kind of a tabula rasa on policy." In December 2015, then Heritage Foundation executive vice president Kim Holmes, authored an essay opposing Trump and his candidacy for Public Discourse, published by the Witherspoon Institute, a Princeton, New Jersey-based think tank, which criticized Trump as "not a conservative." Holmes also criticized Trump supporters, writing that, "they are behaving more like an alienated class of Marxist imagination than as social agents of stability and tradition. They are indeed thinking like revolutionaries, only now their ire is aimed at their progressive masters and the institutions they control," he wrote. Then Heritage president Jim DeMint "praised both Rubio and Cruz, but said that he couldn’t 'make a recommendation coming from Heritage'."

After Trump secured the Republican nomination and only a few days prior to the 2016 general election, the foundation's Restore America Project began emailing potential political appointees in the event Trump won the presidency. "I need to assess your interest in serving as a presidential appointee in an administration that will promote conservative principles," the email said. It asked that questionnaires and a resume or bio be returned to them by October 26, roughly a week prior to the general election.

=== First Trump administration ===
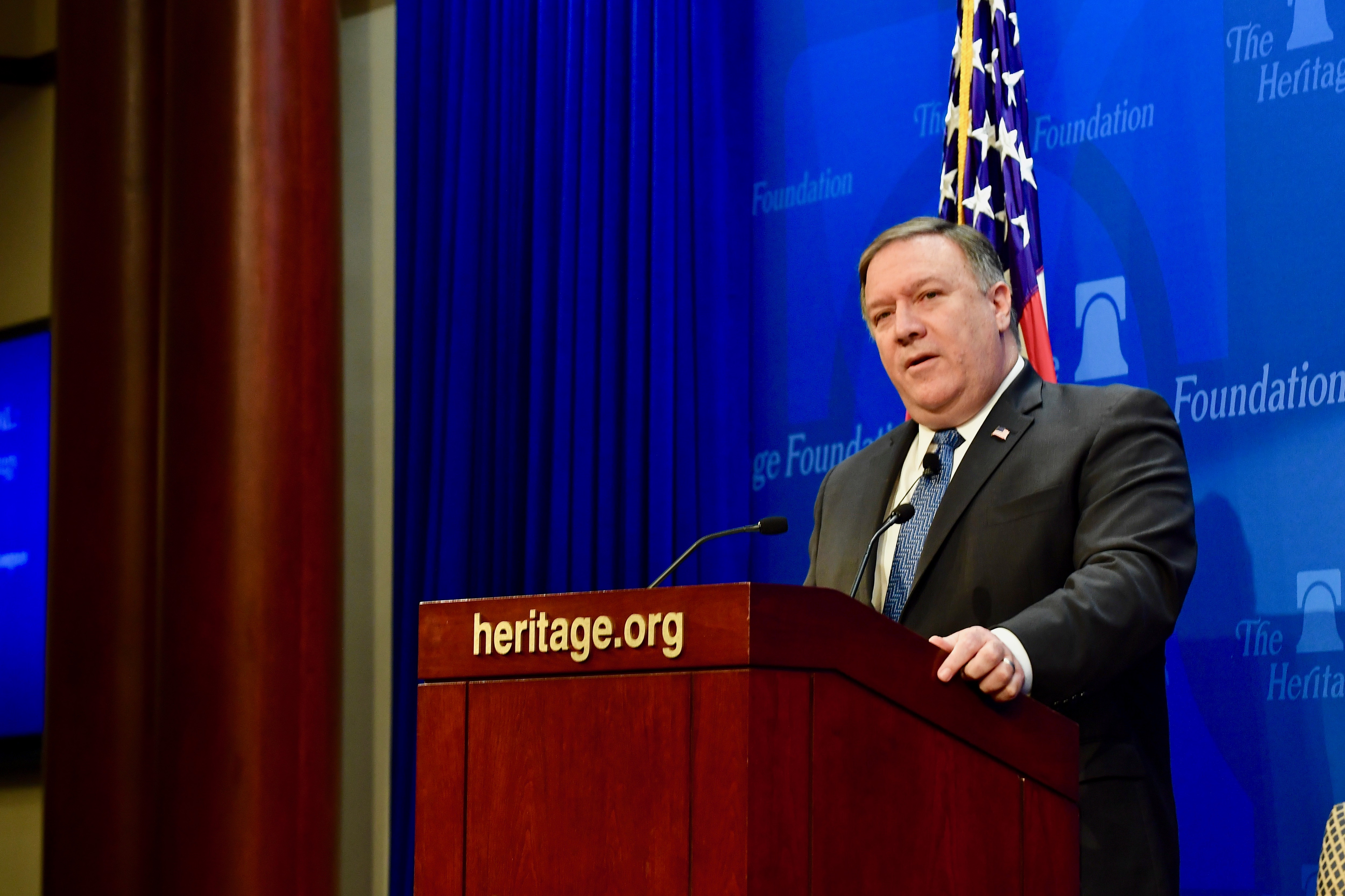
U.S. secretary of state Mike Pompeo addressing the Heritage Foundation in May 2018

Following Trump's victory in the 2016 presidential election, the Heritage Foundation obtained influence in his presidential transition and administration. The foundation had a say in the staffing of the administration with CNN reporting in January 2017 that, "no other Washington institution has that kind of footprint in the transition." One reason for the Heritage Foundation's disproportionate influence relative to other conservative think tanks, CNN reported, was that other conservative think tanks had "Never Trump" staff during the 2016 presidential election, while the Heritage Foundation ultimately signaled that it would be supportive of him.

Drawing from a database that the foundation began building in 2014 of approximately 3,000 conservatives it trusted to serve in a hypothetical Republican administration, at least 66 foundation employees and alumni were hired into the Trump's first presidential term. According to employees involved in developing the foundation's database, several hundred people from the database ultimately entered the Trump administration and at least five, Betsy DeVos, Mick Mulvaney, Rick Perry, Scott Pruitt, Jeff Sessions, became members of Trump's cabinet. Jim DeMint, president of the foundation from 2013 to 2017, personally intervened on behalf of Mulvaney, who ended up heading the Office of Management and Budget and the Consumer Financial Protection Bureau, and later served as Trump's acting White House chief of staff.

==== Jim DeMint termination ====
In May 2017, the foundation's board of trustees voted unanimously to terminate DeMint as its president. In a public statement, the foundation's board said that, following a thorough investigation of the foundation's operations under DeMint's management, they found "significant and worsening management issues that led to a breakdown of internal communications and cooperation." DeMint's firing was praised by some, including former U.S. representative Mickey Edwards (R-OK), who said he saw it as a step to pare back the foundation's partisan edge and restore its reputation as a pioneering think tank. In January 2018, Kay Coles James succeeded DeMint as the foundation's president. The same month, a year into the first Trump presidential term, Heritage said the Trump administration had embraced 64% of 334 policies in the foundation's agenda.

=== Biden administration ===
In February 2021, after Trump lost reelection, the Heritage Foundation hired three former Trump administration officials, Ken Cuccinelli, Mark A. Morgan, and Chad Wolf, who held various roles in immigration-related functions in the Trump administration. Cuccinelli and Wolf authored several publications in 2021 before leaving the foundation.

At the same time, Heritage also hired former U.S. vice president Mike Pence as a distinguished visiting fellow. The following month, in March 2021, Pence authored an op-ed column, which made false claims of fraud in the 2020 presidential election, including numerous false claims about the For the People Act, a Democrat-supported bill designed to expand voting rights. Pence's false claims drew criticism and corrections from multiple media outlets and fact-checking organizations. Pence left the foundation in 2022.

The foundation's positions and management under Kay Coles James drew criticism from conservatives and Trump allies, which intensified in 2020 and 2021. "In the early days of the pandemic in spring 2020, Heritage leadership under James rejected an article from one of its scholars denouncing government restrictions, two people with knowledge of the matter said. The foundation's offices stayed closed for about three months, and signs urging masking became something of a joke for many conservatives who mocked the concept," The Washington Post reported in February 2022. Conservatives also began commenting publicly that the Heritage Foundation had lost the significant intellectual and political clout that led to the foundation's ascent as a global and national political and policy force in the 1980s and 1990s. Think-tank leader and commentator Avik Roy told The Washington Post, "People do not walk around in fear of the Heritage Foundation the way they did 10 years ago". In March 2021, in response to mounting criticism of her leadership of the foundation, James and executive vice president Kim Holmes resigned from the foundation.

In October 2021, the Heritage Foundation announced that Kevin Roberts, who previously led a state-based think tank, Texas Public Policy Foundation and was a member of Texas governor Greg Abbott's COVID-19 task force, would replace James as the foundation's new president. According to the foundation's filing with the Internal Revenue Service, Roberts was compensated $953,920 annually as of 2023.

In May 2022, the Heritage Foundation began opposing military aid to Ukraine designed to repel Russia's invasion of the nation, which the foundation previously supported. Following the reversal of its position on military aid to Ukraine, the foundation claimed, "Ukraine Aid Package Puts America Last". In September 2022, the foundation's foreign policy director said the foundation ordered him to retract his earlier statements supporting aid to Ukraine; he subsequently left the organization. In August 2023, Thomas Spoehr, the foundation's Center for National Defense director, resigned his position over the dramatic policy change.

In September 2022, Luke Coffey, then director of the Heritage Foundation's Douglas and Sarah Allison Center for Foreign Policy, said he was "required by management to remove a Twitter post condemning the January 6 Capitol riots."

In March 2023, the Heritage Foundation established a cooperative relationship with the Danube Institute, a Budapest-based state-funded think tank founded in 2013.

In January 2024, Roberts told journalist Lulu Garcia-Navarro in an interview that he sees Heritage's role as "institutionalizing Trumpism". Garcia-Navarro summarized this role as "leading Project 2025...[to] consolidate power in the executive branch, dismantle federal agencies and recruit and vet government employees to free the next Republican president from a system...stacked against conservative power." The Economist reported the following month that Heritage was incrementally embracing national conservatism as its guiding ideology.

In May 2024, the Heritage Foundation donated $100,000 to the American Accountability Foundation (AAF) for the purpose of AAF developing a website that features personal information of career civil servants, who AAF describes as "America's Most Subversive Immigration Bureaucrats". The website publicly features their photographs, small-dollar political donations, and screenshots of their personal social media accounts.

==== Promotion of conspiracy theory ====
In July 2024, according to the Associated Press, the foundation had promoted a conspiracy theory that Biden may attempt to use force to remain in office following the 2024 election if he lost, which ultimately never happened since Biden withdrew from the election nine days later, on July 21, and Trump ultimately defeated Kamala Harris in the general election and peacefully assumed the presidency in January 2025. The same month, in July 2024, The Washington Post reported that, four months before the general election was even held, Heritage had already declared the election illegitimate. In September 2024, The New York Times reported that the Heritage Foundation used deceptive videos during the 2024 US election campaign to falsely claim that noncitizen voting posed a major threat.

=== Second Trump administration ===
==== Ideological realignment and staff turnover ====
In December 2025, The Wall Street Journal reported that about 15 of Heritage’s employees (including several top executives) were leaving Heritage for the Mike Pence-affiliated group Advancing American Freedom. Among them were John Malcolm, head of Heritage’s legal and judicial studies center; Kevin Dayaratna, head of its data analysis center; and Richard Stern, director of the Heritage economic policy studies institute. In an editorial, the Journal said this reflected major shifts in Heritage since Kevin Roberts became its president, writing:

Heritage once supported free trade; now it is protectionist. It once supported a robust American foreign policy; Heritage purged its defense hawks two years ago. Heritage was a supporter of the originalist judicial revolution and the rule of law; now it defends Mr. Trump’s expansion of executive power whether or not it has a constitutional basis.

In 2024, Roberts was interviewed by The New York Times and said that the Heritage Foundation's role would be "institutionalizing Trumpism." The shift from conservatism to a pro-Trump direction led Advancing American Freedom to poach dozens of Heritage Foundation staff and donors.

In July 2026, The New York Times reported that the foundation had been "consumed by an ideological and generational civil war" within the Republican Party over how to absorb Trumpism without being overtaken by its conspiracy and nativist elements.

The Times reported that 293 people had left Heritage since Roberts became president in 2021. Departures increased after his October 2025 video defending Tucker Carlson. Employees were dismissed or resigned with little explanation, and some former staff said that they had begun communicating over Signal and burner phones out of concern that work computers were being monitored. A 2025 letter from an employee to Heritage's board of trustees alleged a pattern of religiously and ideologically motivated hiring and dismissals under Roberts.

The report also described debates among newer staff that questioned the historical consensus on World War II and whether the Holocaust happened, with several employees expressing sympathy for a revisionist account by Pat Buchanan. Heritage's chief economist at the time, E. J. Antoni, publicly praised Buchanan's book.

==== Sued over civil rights ====
In July 2026, Mahmoud Khalil filed a lawsuit, citing the Ku Klux Klan Act and alleging that the Heritage Foundation, through its Project Esther initiative, conspired with pro-Israel organizations and top officials in the Trump administration to deny Palestine liberation advocates their constitutional rights.

== Influence ==
The Heritage Foundation has historically ranked among the world's most influential think tanks, influencing concrete policies, media, and political discourse in general. In 2020, the Global Go To Think Tank Index Report, published by the University of Pennsylvania, ranked the foundation sixth on its list of "top ten think tanks in the United States", 13th among think tanks globally, and first in its category of think tanks having the most significant impact on public policy between 2017 and 2019.

== Operations ==
=== Policy Review ===
From its 1973 founding through 2001, the Heritage Foundation published Policy Review, a public policy journal and its flagship publication; the journal was acquired by the Hoover Institution in 2001.

=== Mandate for Leadership ===
In 1981, the Heritage Foundation published Mandate for Leadership, which offered specific policy recommendations on policy, budget, and administrative action for the incoming Reagan administration. Eight additional editions of Mandate for Leadership have been published since.

=== Asian Studies Center ===
In 1983, the Heritage Foundation established its Asian Studies Center, which publishes research studies and commentary on Asia and the Pacific Rim and U.S. policy toward the region. The center has also hosted lectures about Asia by Henry Kissinger, Donald Rumsfeld, Paul Wolfowitz, Henry Paulson, and others.

=== State Policy Network ===
The Heritage Foundation is an associate member of the State Policy Network, founded in 1992, a network of conservative and libertarian organizations financed by the Koch brothers, Philip Morris, and other corporate sources.

=== Index of Economic Freedom ===
Since 1995, the Heritage Foundation has published Index of Economic Freedom, an annual publication that measures countries' state of economic freedom, using property rights, freedom from government regulation, corruption in government, barriers to international trade, income tax and corporate tax rates, government expenditures, rule of law and the ability to enforce contracts, regulatory burdens, banking restrictions, labor regulations, and black market activities as key metrics.

In 1997, The Wall Street Journal began partnering with Heritage as co-manager and co-editor of the Index of Economic Freedom. In 2014, Charles W. L. Hill, a professor at the Foster School of Business at the University of Washington, criticized the Index of Economic Freedom, writing that, "given that the Heritage Foundation has a political agenda, its work should be viewed with caution."

=== 2012 Republican presidential debate ===
In November 2011, the Heritage Foundation and the American Enterprise Institute (AEI) co-hosted a debate among the candidates for the 2012 Republican presidential nomination on foreign policy and national defense issues, which was televised by CNN and was the first presidential debate hosted by Heritage or AEI. Heritage fellows Edwin Meese and David Addington were among the debate's moderators. Following the debate, political commentator Michael Barone wrote in The Washington Examiner that it was "probably the most substantive and serious presidential debate of this election cycle."

=== The Daily Signal ===
In June 2014, the Heritage Foundation phased out its blog, the Foundry, replacing it with the Daily Signal, a news and conservative commentary website. A decade later, in June 2024, The Signal became an independent publication with its own board of directors and leadership.

=== Project 2025 ===
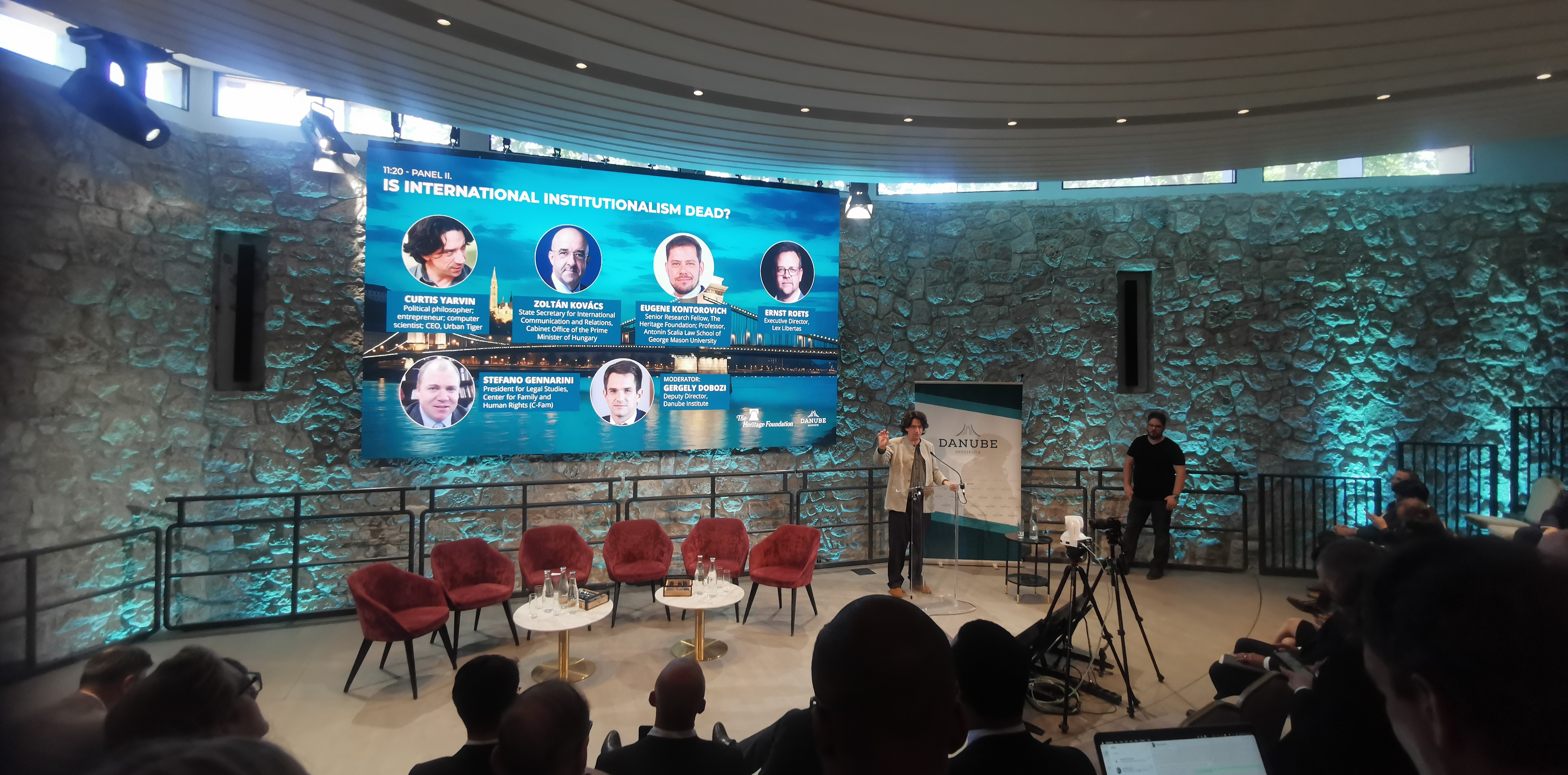
Curtis Yarvin speaking at Geopolitical Summit Budapest 2025

Project 2025 (also known as the 2025 Presidential Transition Project) is a political initiative published in April 2023 by the Heritage Foundation with the goal of reshaping the U.S. federal government by consolidating executive power in favor of right-wing policies. It constitutes a policy document that suggests specific changes to the federal government, a personnel database for recommending vetting loyal staff in the federal government, and a set of proposed executive orders for the U.S. president to implement those policies.

Paul Dans, the former director of the political initiative’s launch in April 2022 until August 2024, is known as the "architect of Project 2025". On July 30, 2024, Dans announced he was stepping down from his position as Director of Project 2025 at the Heritage Foundation in the wake of public criticism from President Trump. In a statement, Heritage stated that the decision to part ways was mutual and due to strategic differences, clarifying reports that Dans had been terminated over issues of alleged misconduct. Days before Dans stepped down, he appeared on a podcast run by Tenet Media, a company that was found to have received funding from Russia Today and was ultimately used to promote Russian propaganda.

=== Project Esther ===
Project Esther is a project of the Heritage Foundation, a conservative think tank based in Washington, D.C., that aims to suppress pro-Palestinian protests and what it classifies as antisemitism. The effort has received support from several evangelical Christian organizations but no major Jewish ones. According to The New York Times, Slate, Haaretz, The Forward, and Jewish Insider, Project Esther does not address right-wing antisemitism.

Project Esther has been criticized for incorporating antisemitic tropes into its rhetoric. It broadly labels criticism of Israel as terrorism and calls for targeting universities, students, and American progressive politics and politicians. Politico described Project Esther as "a lesser-known blueprint from the same creators of Project 2025." In May 2025, The New York Times found that the second Trump administration had called for or acted upon more than half of Project Esther's proposals.

Victoria Coates, the Heritage Foundation vice president overseeing Project Esther, acknowledged parallels between the administration's actions and the project, saying that implementation had begun on some of its proposed legal and financial measures.

=== Other initiatives ===
==== Publications ====
The Heritage Foundation publishes The Insider, a quarterly magazine about public policy. In 1995, the Heritage Foundation in participation with National Review, started Townhall, a conservative website. The site separated from Heritage in 2005 and was subsequently acquired by Salem Communications.

==== Index of Dependence ====
Beginning in 2002, the Heritage Foundation began publishing "Index of Dependence", an annual report on federal government programs in five areas: housing, health care and welfare, retirement, higher education, and rural and agricultural services that, in its view, constrain private sector or local government alternatives and impact the dependence of individuals on the federal government. The 2010 edition of the "Index of Dependence" concluded that the number of Americans who pay nothing in federal personal income taxes and the number who rely on government services have both increased measurably, and that, over the prior eight years, Americans' dependence on government had grown by almost 33 percent. In February 2012, the foundation's conclusions were challenged by Rex Nutting of MarketWatch, who wrote that the report was "misleading" and "alarmist", that the percentage of Americans "dependent" upon government had remained essentially the same as it was in the 1980s, and that a small increase was attributable to the Great Recession and an aging population with proportionally more retirees.

==== Margaret Thatcher Center for Freedom ====
In September 2005, the Heritage Foundation established the Margaret Thatcher Center for Freedom named in honor of the former British prime minister Margaret Thatcher. Thatcher maintained a long-standing relationship with the Heritage Foundation. In September 1991, shortly after Thatcher left office, the foundation hosted a dinner in Thatcher's honor. Six years later, in 1997, Thatcher delivered the keynote address at Heritage's 25th anniversary celebration. In 2002, Thatcher was again honored by the foundation, which awarded her with its annual Clare Boothe Luce Award.

Nile Gardiner, a British and American conservative commentator, became a fellow at the foundation in 2002, specializing in Anglo-American security policy. In 2006, he was appointed director of the Margaret Thatcher Center for Freedom. He is co-author with Stephen Thompson of the book Margaret Thatcher on Leadership: Lessons for American Conservatives Today.

==== Oversight Project ====
The Heritage Foundation's Oversight Project started in 2022, whose objective the foundation says is "investigating and exposing the Biden administration". The Oversight Project filed large numbers of FOIA information requests to government agencies.

In a late 2024 interview, Oversight Project director Mike Howell estimated that the foundation had filed 50,000 requests over two years. An October 2024 analysis by ProPublica showed many requests sought the names of employees who have used certain conservative hot-button keywords in communications, such as "climate equity" and "DEI", the acronym standing for diversity, equity, and inclusion. The foundation also sought communications with civil rights and voting rights organizations, and the names of all Biden administration appointees.

In May 2024, the Oversight Project publicized a faked flier to falsely accuse an immigration-assistance NGO of encouraging illegal voting. The social media posts were widely disseminated, and the head of the NGO received threats. The head of the Oversight Project said they had not tried to verify the flier. The Oversight Project was the publisher of a 2024 misleading video, which falsely asserted that 14% of non-citizens in Georgia were registered to vote.

In January 2025, leaked documents from the Oversight Project detailed a plan to dox Wikipedia editors alleged to be antisemitic using techniques such as facial recognition software, cross-referencing to a database of hacked information, tricking Wikipedia users into visiting websites that harvest IP addresses, and creating sock puppet accounts. Journalist Stephen Harrison compared the plan to the 2021 doxing by pro-Chinese government editors, which led to some Hong Kong editors being physically harmed. Howell said that this investigation of Wikipedia will be "shared with the appropriate policymakers to help inform a strategic response". After a month-long discussion, Wikipedia editors decided to blacklist the Heritage Foundation website, meaning that attempts to link to it on Wikipedia will be automatically blocked.

In March 2025, the Oversight Project promulgated an unfounded story casting doubt on the validity of President Biden's presidential actions, claiming that almost all of the documents signed by Biden had identical signatures and therefore had been signed by machine. The foundation claimed, "this raises questions of who was really in control during the Biden Presidency", calling Biden the "Hologram President". The story went viral, casting doubt on the validity of Biden's pardons among other actions and suggesting the president had not been cognizant of presidential actions when there actually had been news stories and photo opportunities of the president signing some of the documents the Oversight Project alleged he had not signed. Other presidents used signing technology, and scholars agree such signatures are valid. The identical signatures found by the Oversight Project, the starting point for its false claims, were an image of the president's signature that is inserted into government documents obtained from the Federal Register.

== Positions ==
The Heritage Foundation considers itself a force for conservatism in the United States. Third party observers have called it right-wing or far-right, especially with regard to Project 2025. The Leadership Conference on Civil and Human Rights wrote that Trump was supported by far-right groups such as the Heritage Foundation and the Federalist Society "and other institutions that have been masterminding the takeover of our courts for decades". The American Federation of Government Employees advised its members that the "far-right Heritage Foundation" was coordinating with Trump to weave Project 2025 into his administration. The Associated Press wrote that Project 2025 "started as an obscure far-right wish list" but became an "ultraconservative policy blueprint", a keystone of Trump's second presidential campaign.

The media noticed the shift from conservative to farther right in 2013. Political journalist Molly Ball wrote in the Atlantic that the Heritage Foundation had changed its strategy in several ways. One was the reversal of its policy on immigration, which since the 1980s had been welcoming and focused on legalization. From 2006 to 2013, the policy gradually became outright hostile to immigration. In 2013, the foundation also pushed Republican lawmakers to split the latest farm bill (which would pass the next year as the Agricultural Act of 2014) to cut out food stamp funding. The group then turned on the same lawmakers, instructing them to vote against the main portion of the bill, angering them and their constituents. Also in 2013, the foundation demanded that Republicans in Congress shut down the government as way to defund Obamacare, while harming many voters economically. The group paid for advertisements against 100 Republican lawmakers who did not toe the line in this regard. Many Republicans expressed anger at this radical shift in tactics; longtime Republican policy analyst Brian Walsh wrote "a scathing op-ed in U.S. News" saying that the foundation had outspent the Democratic Party in attacking Republicans in Congress without targeting any vulnerable Democratic seats.

=== Black Lives Matter ===
In September 2021, a Heritage Foundation senior fellow, Mike Gonzalez, released a book, BLM: The New Making of a Marxist Revolution, which characterizes Black Lives Matter as "a nationwide insurgency" and labels its leaders "avowed Marxists who say they want to dismantle our way of life".

=== Climate change denial ===
The Heritage Foundation rejects the scientifically proven consensus on climate change. The foundation is one of many climate change denial organizations that have been funded by ExxonMobil, an oil and petroleum company that, with over $413 billion in 2022 revenue, is the eighth-largest corporation in the world.

In December 1997, the foundation strongly criticized the Kyoto Agreement to curb climate change, arguing that U.S. participation in the treaty would "result in lower economic growth in every state and nearly every sector of the economy." In 2009, the foundation projected that the cap-and-trade bill, known as the American Clean Energy and Security Act, would cost the average U.S. family $1,870 by 2025 and $6,800 by 2035, which varied greatly from conclusions from the non-partisan Congressional Budget Office, which projected that it would cost the average family $175 in 2020.

=== Critical race theory ===
In 2021, the Heritage Foundation said that one of its two priorities, along with tightening voting laws, was to push Republican-controlled states to ban or restrict critical race theory instruction. The Heritage Foundation sought to get Republicans in Congress to put anti-critical race theory provisions into must-pass legislation such as the annual defense spending bill.

=== Election fraud ===
The Heritage Foundation has promoted false claims of electoral fraud. Hans von Spakovsky, who heads the Heritage Foundation's Election Law Reform Initiative, has played an influential role in elevating alarmism about voter fraud in the Republican Party, despite offering no evidence of widespread voter fraud. His work, which claims voting fraud is rampant, has been discredited.

Following the 2020 presidential election, in which President Donald Trump made baseless claims of fraud after he was defeated for reelection, the Heritage Foundation launched a campaign in support of Republican efforts to make state voting laws more restrictive.

In March 2021, The New York Times reported that the Heritage Foundation's political arm, Heritage Action, planned to spend $24 million over two years across eight key states to support efforts to restrict voting, in coordination with the Republican Party and allied conservative outside groups, including the Susan B. Anthony Pro-Life America, American Legislative Exchange Council, and State Policy Network. Almost two dozen election bills introduced by Republican state legislators in early 2021 were based on a Heritage letter and report. Heritage also mobilized in opposition to H.R. 1./S. 1, a Democratic bill to establish uniform nationwide voting standards, including expanded early and postal voting, automatic and same-day voter registration, campaign finance law reforms, and prohibiting partisan redistricting.

In May 2021, Heritage Action spent $750,000 on television ads in Arizona to promote the false claim that "Democrats...want to register illegal aliens" to vote, even though the Democrats' legislation creates safeguards to ensure that ineligible people cannot register. In April 2021, Heritage Action boasted to its private donors that it had successfully crafted the election reform bills that Republican state legislators introduced in Georgia and other states.

On January 21, 2024, after three years of silence on Trump's position that Biden was an illegitimate president and that Trump actually won the 2020 election, Lulu Garcia-Navarro, a reporter for The New York Times, presented the question to Heritage president Kevin Roberts: "Do you believe that President Biden won the 2020 election?" "No", Roberts replied.

The New York Times reported in September 2024 that "the notion that [noncitizens] will flood the polls—and vote overwhelmingly for Democrats—is animating a sprawling network of Republicans who mobilized around" Trump after he claimed the 2020 election was rigged, and "the false theories about widespread noncitizen voting could be used to dispute the outcome again." In summer 2024, the Heritage Oversight Project produced videos for distribution on social media and conservative media outlets that made false or misleading claims about the extent of noncitizen voting registrations. In one video that was sent viral by an Elon Musk repost, Heritage falsely claimed that 14% of noncitizens in Georgia were registered, concluding, "the integrity of the 2024 election is in great jeopardy." Heritage based their findings on an extrapolation of hidden camera interview responses from seven residents in a Norcross, Georgia apartment complex. State investigators found the seven people had never registered. Heritage maintains an election fraud database that in 2024 showed just 68 documented instances of noncitizen voting since the 1980s, and just 10 of those were in the country illegally. When Heritage president Kevin Roberts was presented in June 2024 with data from the Heritage database indicating there were only 1,513 total instances of voter fraud in the United States since 1982, he responded that fraud is "very hard to document, and the Democrat party is very good at fraud." When asked if Heritage would accept the results of the 2024 presidential election regardless of who wins, Roberts replied, "yes, if there isn't massive fraud like there was in 2020." Despite the persistence of an election denial movement, no evidence of material election fraud in 2020 was found.

In July 2024, Mike Howell, Heritage's executive director for its Oversight Project said, "as things stand right now, there is a zero percent chance of a free and fair election in the United States of America," adding, "I'm formally accusing the Biden administration of creating the conditions that most reasonable policymakers and officials cannot in good conscience certify an election." Heritage released a report predicting without supporting evidence that Biden might try to retain power "by force" if he were to lose in November. Election law expert Rick Hasen remarked, "this is gaslighting and it is dangerous in fanning flames that could lead to potential violence."

=== LGBTQ rights opposition ===
In 2013, a Heritage Foundation panel denounced the Boy Scouts of America organization's proposal to allow membership for gay boy scouts, but not gay scout leaders. Heritage's panelists variously argued that the proposal, if implemented, would be a "fatal concession" that would lead to "increased boy on boy contact", "moral confusion", and damage to "understanding of fatherhood" or "character formation".

The Heritage Foundation has controversially opposed gay marriage, including both the 2015 Obergefell v. Hodges decision by the Supreme Court, and the 2022 Respect for Marriage Act. Ahead of the Obergefell ruling, Heritage's Ryan T. Anderson argued that gay acceptance is linked to single motherhood, sexual permissiveness, and reformed divorce laws. He added that the issue should be left to the states, but that the states should not legalize gay marriage either. Arguing against the 2022 Respect for Marriage Act, Heritage's Roger Severino stated: "Marriage is the exclusive, lifelong, conjugal union between one man and one woman, and any departure from that design hurts the indispensable goal of having every child raised in a stable home by the mom and dad who conceived him." In 2010, the Heritage Foundation also conducted meetings, which included social researchers opposed to gay marriage, which reportedly helped lead to the publication of the controversial New Family Structures Study.

The group has engaged in several activities in opposition to transgender rights, including hosting several anti-transgender rights events, developing and supporting legislation templates against transgender rights, and making claims about transgender youth healthcare and suicide rates based on internal research, which are contradicted by numerous peer-reviewed scientific studies. The Heritage Foundation–led initiative Project 2025 proposed LGBT-related policies, including the limiting of LGBT anti-discrimination protections, and a ban on transgender people from the military.

In September 2025, the Heritage Foundation called on the Federal Bureau of Investigation to designate "Transgender Ideology-Inspired Violent Extremism" (TIVE) as a threat category for domestic terrorism. Using a dataset of eight shootings, it claimed that "50% of major (non-gang) school shootings since 2015" involved trans-related motives. This assertion was discredited by gun violence researchers and called "misleading by design, arbitrary in scope, and unscientific at its core."

In July 2026, the Heritage Foundation partnered with Alliance Defending Freedom to represent a Colorado school district that was sued for removing books "primarily by or about LGBTQ people, people of color, or both" from its libraries. In Project 2025, the foundation wrote, "children suffer the toxic normalization of transgenderism with drag queens and pornography invading their school libraries."

=== Russian–Ukrainian War ===
In May 2022, Heritage Action, the Heritage Foundation's political activism organization, announced its opposition to the $40 billion military aid package for Ukraine passed that month following the Russian invasion of Ukraine in February, completely reversing the organization's previous position of support for such aid. The Heritage Foundation's foreign policy director at the time, Luke Coffey, said he was ordered to retract his earlier statements supporting aid to Ukraine; he subsequently left the foundation.

In August 2023, newly installed Heritage president Kevin Roberts wrote in an op-ed column that Congress was holding victims of the 2023 Hawaii wildfires hostage "in order to spend more money in Ukraine". The op-ed was followed by a public messaging campaign with the same message and with a tweet by a Heritage vice president, who argued, "It's time to end the blank, undated checks for Ukraine." This, in turn, led the foundation's second senior official, Lt. Gen. (Ret) Thomas Spoehr, director of Heritage's Center for National Defense, to submit his resignation.

=== Antisemitism ===
In October 2025, the Heritage Foundation publicly supported Tucker Carlson after Carlson had the white nationalist and Holocaust denier Nick Fuentes on his podcast. The Heritage Foundation's defense of Carlson ignited a debate about antisemitism among conservatives. Republicans including Ted Cruz and Mitch McConnell condemned the foundation's defense of Carlson. Several people resigned from the foundation when it was clear that no public retraction would be made, including board members Robert P. George, Shane McCullar, and Abby Spencer Moffat. Distinguished fellow Christopher DeMuth, chief of staff Ryan Neuhaus, and at least five members of the foundation's antisemitism task force also resigned.

By 2026, Carlson told The New York Times that he considered the organization irrelevant, saying it answered to donors' preferences on Israel and taxes rather than independent analysis.

== Funding ==
Heritage is a tax-exempt 501(c)(3) organization and BBB Wise Giving Alliance-accredited charity funded by donations from private individuals, corporations, and charitable foundations. It is not required to disclose its donors and donations under the current laws that guide tax-deductible organizations.

In 1973, businessman Joseph Coors contributed $250,000 to establish the Heritage Foundation and continued to fund it through the Adolph Coors Foundation. The foundation's trustees have historically included individuals affiliated with Chase Manhattan Bank, Dow Chemical, General Motors, Mobil, Pfizer, Sears, and other corporations.

In the 1980s, the Heritage Foundation reportedly received a $2.2 million donation from the Korean Central Intelligence Agency, the intelligence agency of South Korea.

As of 2010, the foundation reported that it had 710,000 individual financial contributors.

For the fiscal year ending December 31, 2011, CharityWatch reported that Edwin Feulner, the Heritage Foundation's past president, received the highest compensation in its top 25 list of compensation received by charity members. Two years later, in 2013, according to CharityWatch, Feulner received $2,702,687, which included investment earnings of $1,656,230 accrued over 33 years.

As of 2013, Heritage is a grantee of DonorsTrust, an Alexandria, Virginia-based nonprofit donor-advised fund.

In 2023, the foundation's total revenue was $101 million and its expenditures were $103 million, according to its filings with the Internal Revenue Service, reported by ProPublica. Among its 517 employees as of 2023, average compensation was $96,000 annually, and 15 employees were paid in excess of $300,000 annually that year. The foundation's president, Kevin Roberts, was compensated $953,920 annually in 2023.

== Trustees ==
As of June 2024, eighteen individuals serve as members of the organization's board of trustees. Notable members include:

- Larry P. Arnn (since 2002), president, Hillsdale College
- Rebekah Mercer (since 2014), director, Mercer Family Foundation
- Brian Tracy (since 2003), motivational public speaker and self-development author

Notable former board members include:

- Edwin Feulner (1973–2025), co-founder and former president, the Heritage Foundation
- Robert P. George, professor, Princeton University, who resigned in 2025 over the refusal of the group's president to retract statements defending Tucker Carlson's interview with white supremacist Nick Fuentes.
- Edwin Meese, former U.S. attorney general
- Marion G. Wells, philanthropist and president, Marion G. Wells Foundation
- Preston A. Wells Jr., businessman and philanthropist
