= Economics Job Market Rumors =

Internet forum

Economics Job Market Rumors, also known as EJMR, was an anonymous internet discussion board that caters to academic economists and job seekers. It has been the subject of several journalistic articles, and has been heavily criticised by academics, due to its reputation for racist and misogynistic discussions as well as personal attacks.

== History ==
Launched in 2008, the site was intended for PhD students to discuss the Economics job market. The original founder of the site was an anonymous academic who went by the name Tatonnement, who later handed EJMR over to its current administrator, who goes by the name Kirk. In May 2023, the fraud-tracking website Hucksters.net connected David Griffith-Jones, the son of famed economist Stephany Griffith-Jones, to the ownership history of EJMR, although he claimed in emails with Inside Higher Ed that he was no longer involved with the website.

In 2017, economics major Alice Wu researched the top words used in conversation along male/female lines and discovered that conversations about men contain more words related to economics, while conversations about women relate more to physical and personal attributes. University of California, Berkeley economist David Romer described the forum as “a cesspool of misogyny.”

In 2023, researchers at Boston University and Yale University were able to discern the IP addresses of forum users from the poorly anonymized random usernames. This is due to the site using a one-way hash without a Salt. These IP addresses were associated with many organizations. According to the researchers, "our analysis reveals that the users who post on EJMR are predominantly economists, including those working in the upper echelons of academia, government and the private sector".

In August 2026 the site went offline for roughly three weeks, leading some to claim that it had been shut down for good. It was back online by 2 September 2026, and is offline again as of November 19th 2026.
