= Thad McIntosh Guyer =

American lawyer

- Born: January 29, 1950 (age 76); Los Angeles, California
- Education: Georgetown University; Antioch School of Law
- Scientific career
- Fields: Civil Rights Law, Whistleblower Law, Sarbanes-Oxley
- Workplaces: T.M. Guyer and Ayers & Friends, PC; Government Accountability Project

Thad McIntosh Guyer (born January 29, 1950) is an American civil rights and whistleblowing lawyer, lecturer and advisor with an international law practice based in Oregon. He is known for defending whistleblowers in retaliation cases at large institutions including the United Nations, World Bank, International Labour Organization and African Development Bank.

He is a trial, appellate and international litigation attorney with the Government Accountability Project, a non-profit whistleblower rights organization based in Washington, DC. He has successfully represented many whistleblowers and has been involved with more than 40 published legal precedents in U.S. federal and state courts.

Guyer developed an information theory framework for the proper functioning of whistleblower reporting channels that relies on entropy and Shannon information, among other concepts. The framework was first presented in Europe in 2021.

== Education and military service ==
After graduating in 1969 from North Miami Senior High School in Miami, Guyer was conscripted through the military draft and fought in the U.S. Army during the Vietnam War. He was a member of the 199th Light Infantry Brigade, 25th Infantry Division. He earned the rank of Sergeant and received the Bronze Star for meritorious service after his one-year tour. He was honorably discharged in 1970. Guyer recounted his time in Vietnam for the U.S. Library of Congress's Veterans History Project.

Guyer attended the Georgetown University Edmund A. Walsh School of Foreign Service and graduated in 1975 with a bachelor's degree in international law and politics. He graduated from Antioch School of Law in Washington, DC, in 1978. "What captured us about Antioch is that we were coming out of a mind-set of the antiwar movement of the '60s and had developed a case for activism," Guyer is quoted as saying.

== Legal career ==
Guyer worked with Legal Services Corporation dating to 1978 in Tennessee, Arkansas, and Oregon. Guyer has worked with T.M. Guyer & Friends, PC since 1990. In 2005 he partnered with attorney Stephani L. Ayer to form T.M. Guyer and Ayers & Friends, PC. This private law firm focuses on corporate accountability, the Sarbanes-Oxley Act and whistleblower representation in cyber security, nuclear safety, petrochemical and pipeline safety, aviation safety, and food and pharmaceutical safety.

== Whistleblower litigation ==
Guyer has been an active litigator before the United States Merit Systems Protection Board representing federal employees who have been retaliated against for reporting fraud, abuse of authority, waste and environmental abuses by federal agencies.

Guyer is known for challenging of the wrongful termination of Shawn Carpenter by Sandia National Laboratories, which The New Yorker called foundational in dealing with government-sponsored "digital vigilantism". Guyer and his law partner Stephani L. Ayers co-counseled the case with American civil liberties lawyer Philip B. Davis. After suing Sandia in 2005, Carpenter was awarded $4.7 million by a jury in 2007. "Mr. Carpenter was not somebody...who became bored with his administrative-nature job and then just started trying to become a cybersleuth", The New Yorker quotes Guyer as saying during his closing argument at the trial. "His had to do with protecting the national security."

Guyer has worked with the Government Accountability Project (GAP), one of the world's first whistleblower advocacy NGOs, for more than two decades. From 2002 to 2005 he served as GAP's Litigation Director and General Counsel. From 1986 to 2002 he worked as adjunct private attorney at GAP, representing GAP whistleblowers nationwide and internationally.

He has collaborated on numerous cases with GAP Legal Director Thomas M. Devine, who is a contributor on the U.S. Whistleblower Protection Act. Currently he is Of Counsel with GAP for trial, appellate and international litigation, and is GAP's primary litigator in tribunals of the United Nations and other international organizations.

In 2004 Guyer, law partner Stephani Ayers and San Francisco attorney Tony Bothwell successfully represented two police union officials who were fired after reporting security mismanagement at the Lawrence Livermore National Laboratory plutonium weapons facility. The University of California paid the two men a "substantial monetary settlement."

Guyer teamed with GAP to represent six citizens and three environmental groups – G.A.S.P, Oregon Wildlife Federation and Sierra Club – in a case to block the incineration of chemical weapons in rural Oregon. At the time, in 2008, the Umatilla Chemical Demilitarization Facility stored about 3,700 tons of materials to make nerve and mustard gas, in addition to rockets, bombs, projectiles and mines.

In 2011 Guyer and law partner Stefani Ayers successfully settled a whistleblower retaliation on behalf of U.S. Air Force aircraft mechanic George Sarris. Sarris' security clearance was revoked and he was denied meaningful duties after he reported poor maintenance of reconnaissance planes. Fuel, hydraulic and emergency hoses were up to 30 years past their service life, and were not replaced until they visibly deteriorated. Under the settlement, Sarris maintained his mechanic position, derogatory files were removed, and his performance appraisal was restored to "excellent" or "outstanding."

In 2022 Guyer represented Kevin Chmielewski, the former deputy chief of staff of the U.S. Environmental Protection Agency (EPA). Chmielewski was dismissed in February 2018 after raising concerns about EPA Administrator Scott Pruitt's spending habits. Pruitt resigned five months later following accusations of ethical misconduct including overspending, using staff for personal errands, and inappropriate relationships with lobbyists.

== Other litigation ==
Guyer represented an Oregon couple whose home was mistakenly raided by Medford police. Police kicked down the couples' door in search of drug dealers, only to learn it was the wrong house. The couple argued their rights protecting them from unreasonable searches and seizures under the Fourth Amendment of the U.S. Constitution were violated. The case did not go to trial, following decisions by the U.S. Ninth Circuit Court of Appeals in 1991 and the U.S. Supreme Court in 1992.

Other cases include:

• Brown v. Secretary-General of the United Nations

• Yasmina Laasri v. Secretary-General of the United Nations

• Nguyen-Kropp & Postica v. Secretary-General of the United Nations

• Mariela Antiga Bovio v. IDB (Inter-American Development Bank)

== Information theory and whistleblower protection ==
Guyer delivered the paper, “The Whistleblower Dilemma: Understanding the Nature, Legal Dimensions and Control of ‘Information’ ” in Sarajevo in November 2021, at the annual meeting of the Regional Anti-Corruption Initiative and the Southeast Europe Coalition on Whistleblower Protection. Incorporating the concepts of entropy and Shannon information, Guyer posits that inefficiency, obstruction or "noise" in any of the five stations within a whistleblower reporting channel will degrade the transmission and/or receipt of the report. He writes that successfully designed whistleblower channels maximize the collection, storing and sharing of information about corruption.

== International advocacy ==
In 1980 Guyer provided emergency representation to the Cuban refugees involved in the Mariel Boatlift who were being detained by the INS at the former Atlanta Federal Penitentiary. In 1996 he worked with the American Bar Association-supported Coalition for International Justice, researching prisoners' rights under international law at the International Criminal Tribunal for the Former Yugoslavia in The Hague.

In 2006 he served as an advocate for whistleblowers in Tunis, Tunisia who were challenging lending practices involving international aid being administered by the African Development Bank.

== Legal education and presentations ==
Guyer has given lectures at the Drexel University School of Law, The Wharton School of the University of Pennsylvania, Central University of Finance and Economics, Anhui Agricultural University, and at the National Employment Lawyers Association. He has presented webinars for the Government Accountability Project and the American Association for Justice. He has lectured on corporate whistleblowing at the Practicing Law Institute in New York and spoke at the Thomson Reuters’ Fourth Annual Whistleblowing Forum.

He lectured on the state of whistleblower protection laws in the EU at the American Bar Association's midyear meeting on labor and employment law in Rome in 2013. He spoke on "The Role of Whistleblowers in Exposing International Money Laundering, Bribery and Cover-ups” at the 3rd International Anti-Money Laundering and Financial Crime Conference in Bratislava in 2015.

== Writings ==
Guyer co-authored a chapter on whistleblower protection with Mark Worth for the Elgar Concise Encyclopedia of Corruption Law, scheduled for publication in November 2023.

== Views on whistleblowing ==
"A real whistleblower is essentially somebody who has to be tenacious and stick with it over a period of time," Guyer was quoted as saying in 2010. "They’re simply put together that way. These whistleblowers are not capable, in my opinion, of not blowing the whistle. They just can’t tolerate these kinds of dangers and wrongdoing going without some accountability."

Guyer has expressed skepticism of "internal reporting channels" within private companies. He was quoted as calling corporate compliance programs “a giant rhetorical exercise” designed to limit what CEOs hear. Referring to whistleblower reports, he said, “As soon as the hotline call comes in, the cover-up begins."

== Publications ==
- Thad M. Guyer, "SOX, EUROSOX and A Tale of Two Cities: Whistleblower Protection Channels", in Corporate Whistleblowing in 2023, Practising Law Institute, May 2023.
- Thad M. Guyer and Melissa Koven, "Understanding and Handling the Complex 'SOX Plus One' Whistleblower Claim," National Employment Lawyers Association, September 2013.
- Thad M. Guyer and Nikolaus F. Peterson, "The Current State of Whistleblower Law in Europe: A Report by the Government Accountability Project", April 2013.
- Thad M. Guyer and Stephani L. Ayers, "The Dimensions of Sarbanes-Oxley Federal Question Jurisdiction", Practicing Law Institute, 718 PLI/Lit 331, January 2005.
- Thad M. Guyer, "Behind the Technology Curve: Affordable Solutions for Lawyers without Lots of Money", Washington State Bar News, February 2003.
- Thad M. Guyer, Oregon Bar Bulletin, "Email and Horror: The critical need for e-mail redundancy" July 2002.
- Robert S. Catz & Thad M. Guyer, "Federal in Forma Pauperis Litigation: In Search of Judicial Standards", 31 Rutgers Law Review 655 (1979), cited in Case, J., 90 KYLJ 701 Kentucky Law Journal, "Pro Se Litigants at the Summary Judgment Stage".
- Thad M. Guyer and Debra F. Lee, "The Ethics of Poor Law Firm Management in the Legal Services System", 13 Clearinghouse Rev. 484 (1979), cited in "Conceiving a Lawyer's Duty to the Poor", 19 Hofstra Law Review 885 Summer, 1991.
- Thad M. Guyer, Survey of Local Civil Discovery Procedures, (Fed. Judicial Center 1977), cited in Edward F. Sherman, Tulane Journal of International and Comparative Law, "The Evolution of American Civil Trial Process: Towards Greater Congruence with Continental Practice", Spring 1999; and "Report to the President and the Attorney General", 80 F.R.D. 509 January 22, 1979.
