= National Security Whistleblowers Coalition =

The National Security Whistleblowers Coalition (NSWBC), founded in 2004 by former FBI translator Sibel Edmonds in league with over 50 former and current United States government officials from more than a dozen agencies, is an independent, nonpartisan alliance of whistleblowers who have come forward to address weaknesses of US security agencies.

NSWBC is made up of current and former employees of the Federal Bureau of Investigation (FBI), the Central Intelligence Agency (CIA), the Defense Intelligence Agency (DIA), the Drug Enforcement Administration (DEA), the Department of Energy (DOE), the Federal Aviation Administration (FAA), the Federal Reserve, the Department of Homeland Security (DHS) (including the Transportation Security Administration (TSA)), the National Security Agency (NSA), the Department of State, and others. The organization has collectively testified before Congressional committees in the U.S. House of Representatives and Senate to demand that Congress act to end government retaliation against those who expose corruption, misdeeds and errors in the realm of U.S. national security.

== Coalition objectives ==
The NSWBC aims to aid and abet whistleblowers seeking to inform authorities of security vulnerabilities of US intelligence agencies, to counteract the intimidation of employees and the undermining of whistleblower credibility, and to uncover government waste, fraud, abuse and criminal conduct. The coalition is only for whistleblowers who have raised national security issues, not for government workers who have complaints that they were individually discriminated against or wrongly passed over for a promotion.

== Congressional action ==
On March 15, 2005, H.R. 1317, the Federal Employees Protection of Disclosures Act, was introduced by Republican Rep. Todd Platts as a bill in the U.S. House of Representatives. It was redrafted to incorporate some minor phrasing adjustments and was reintroduced as H.R. 3097 on June 28, 2005. It was immediately referred to the House Committee on Government Reform, but as of mid-2007, no further action had been taken on the redraft.

On June 29, 2006, H.R. 1317 was referred to the House Committee on Armed Services Subcommittee on Readiness and to the House Committee on Homeland Security Subcommittee on Management, Integration, and Oversight. Both committees granted extensions for further consideration of the bill, with the last one being a three-week extension granted on November 17, 2006, by the House Committee on Armed Services. The Homeland Security committee was discharged the same day. As of mid-2007, no further action had been taken.

If enacted as law, the bill would clarify the categories of disclosure covered by the Whistleblower Protection Act, reduce the standard of proof of illicit activity that a whistleblower needs to have before they are entitled to the law's protection, outlaw non-disclosure agreements for federal employees that do not include exemptions for whistleblowers, or that limit other disclosures allowed under open government legislation, and increase the burden of proof needed to discipline managers who allegedly retaliate against those making disclosures. The bill also calls for a study of security clearance revocations to be conducted and a report on the study delivered to the House Committee on Government Reform.

In a letter to the NSWBC, Democratic Rep. Henry Waxman praised the coalition and pledged his support for legislation protecting national security whistleblowers:

Let me state unequivocally that all federal government workers deserve whistleblower protection, none more so than national security whistleblowers. ... Our own government has concluded that they can be trusted to work on the most important law enforcement and intelligence projects in today's post-9/11 environment. These officials are critical to our national defense. ... For these reasons, I favor expanding the Whistleblower Protection Act to cover these employees and contractors as fully as possible, as well as making the retaliatory revocation of a security clearance a prohibited personnel practice.

== Members ==
Members include:

- Shawn Carpenter
- Bogdan Dzakovic
- Sibel Edmonds
- Daniel Ellsberg
- Melvin Goodman
- Daniel M. Hirsch
- Karen Kwiatkowski
- Donald Bussey
- Michael Levine
- David MacMichael
- Ray McGovern
- Michael Springmann
- Russ Tice
- Jane Turner
- Robert Wright, Jr.

== See also ==
- Colleen Rowley
- Edward Snowden
- Mark Klein
- Thomas Tamm
- Thomas Andrews Drake
- William Binney
- Concerned Foreign Service Officers
- Government Accountability Project
- National Whistleblower Center
- Project on Government Oversight
- Veteran Intelligence Professionals for Sanity
