= Byzantine Foothold =

Byzantine Foothold is the unclassified code name related to a United States Department of Defense effort within the larger Cyber Initiative framework, specifically aimed at curbing and preventing foreign intrusions into the computer networks of US federal agencies. It has been said that this threat is related to ongoing efforts by Chinese hackers of the People's Liberation Army, but no public documentation is available which would prove that was the case.

The twenty largest American military-industrial contractors have also been invited to participate in the program, after a highly potent hacker attack was detected at the Booz Allen Hamilton Corporation.

Although the US Government sees this as the largest cyber espionage effort against them, no arrests have been made and no specific cyber intruder has been identified. No public information is available as to the state of any on-going investigation related to this intrusion.

== See also ==
- Moonlight Maze
- Titan Rain
- Stakkato
- Stuxnet
