= Sandia National Laboratories =

National laboratory in Albuquerque, New Mexico

- Established: 1949; 77 years ago
- Research type: National security, nuclear science
- Budget: US$5.1 billion
- Director: Laura J. McGill (May 1, 2025 – )
- Staff: 16,988
- Students: 1,116
- Location: Albuquerque, New Mexico (35.050657°N 106.543136°W); Livermore, California
- Campus: 8,699 acres (35.20 km^{2})
- Named after: Sandia Mountains in the Albuquerque metropolitan area
- Affiliations: United States Department of Energy
- Operating agency: National Technology and Engineering Solutions of Sandia, under the direction of Honeywell International (since May 1, 2017)
- Website: sandia.gov

Sandia National Laboratories (SNL), also known as Sandia, is one of three research and development laboratories of the United States Department of Energy's National Nuclear Security Administration (NNSA). Headquartered in Kirtland Air Force Base in Albuquerque, New Mexico, it has a second principal facility next to Lawrence Livermore National Laboratory in Livermore, California, and a test facility in Waimea, Kauaʻi, Hawaii. Sandia is owned by the U.S. federal government but privately managed and operated by National Technology and Engineering Solutions of Sandia, a wholly owned subsidiary of Honeywell International.

Established in 1949, SNL is a "multimission laboratory" with the primary goal of advancing U.S. national security by developing various science-based technologies. Its work spans roughly 70 areas of activity, including nuclear deterrence, arms control, nonproliferation, hazardous waste disposal, and climate change. Sandia hosts a wide variety of research initiatives, including computational biology, physics, materials science, alternative energy, psychology, MEMS, and cognitive science. Most notably, it hosted some of the world's earliest and fastest supercomputers, ASCI Red and ASCI Red Storm, and is currently home to the Z Machine, the largest X-ray generator in the world, which is designed to test materials in conditions of extreme temperature and pressure.

Sandia conducts research through partnership agreements with academic, governmental, and commercial entities; educational opportunities are available through several programs, including the Securing Top Academic Research & Talent at Historically Black Colleges and Universities (START HBCU) Program and the Sandia University Partnerships Network (a collaboration with Purdue University, University of Texas at Austin, Georgia Institute of Technology, University of Illinois Urbana–Champaign, and University of New Mexico).

== Lab history ==
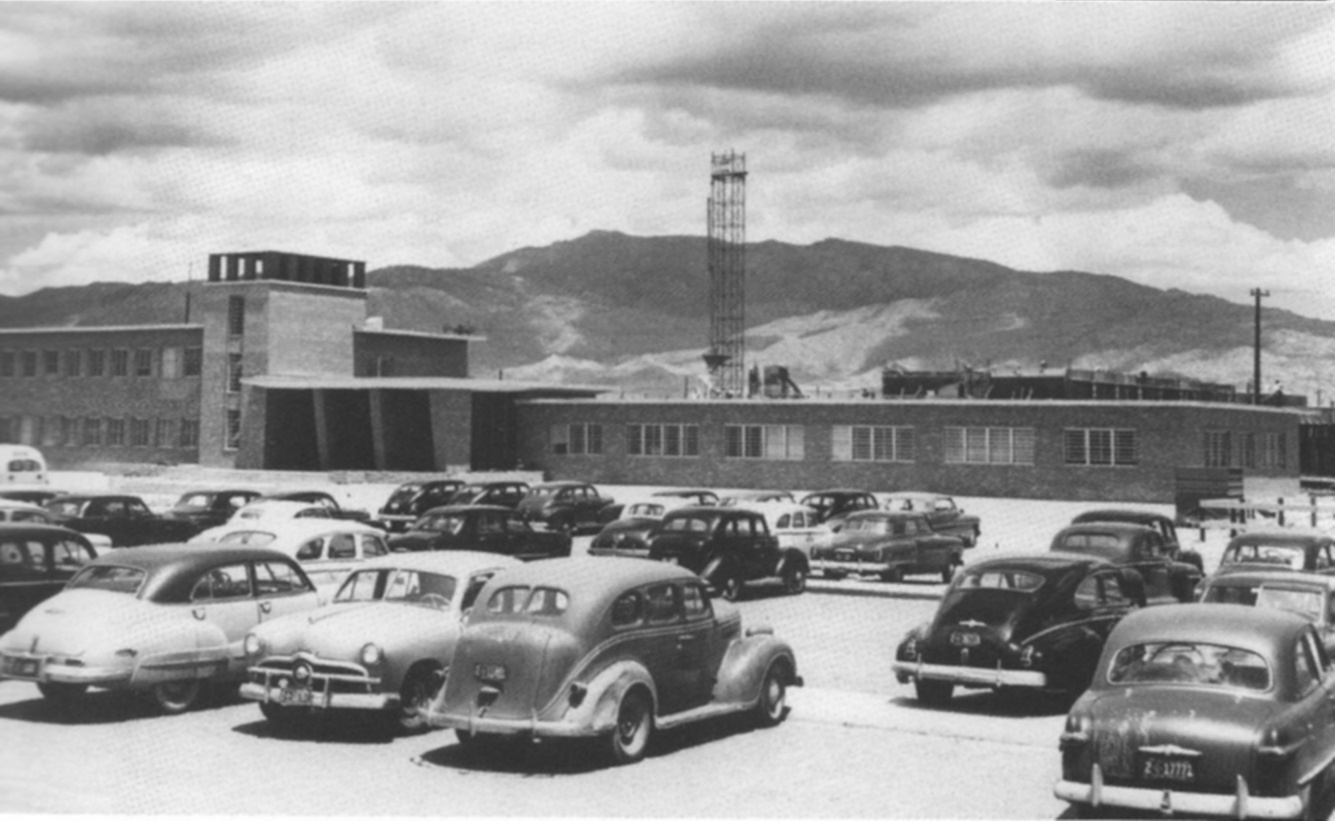
One of Sandia's first permanent buildings (Building 800) was completed in 1949.

Sandia National Laboratories' roots go back to World War II and the Manhattan Project. Prior to the United States formally entering the war, the U.S. Army leased land near an Albuquerque, New Mexico airport known as Oxnard Field to service transient Army and U.S. Navy aircraft. In January 1941 construction began on the Albuquerque Army Air Base, leading to establishment of the Bombardier School-Army Advanced Flying School near the end of the year. Soon thereafter it was renamed Kirtland Field, after early Army military pilot Colonel Roy C. Kirtland, and in mid-1942 the Army acquired Oxnard Field. During the war years facilities were expanded further and Kirtland Field served as a major Army Air Forces training installation.

In the many months leading up to successful detonation of the first atomic bomb, the Trinity test, and delivery of the first airborne atomic weapon, Project Alberta, J. Robert Oppenheimer, Director of Los Alamos Laboratory, and his technical advisor, Hartly Rowe, began looking for a new site convenient to Los Alamos for the continuation of weapons development – especially its non-nuclear aspects. They felt a separate division would be best to perform these functions. Kirtland had fulfilled Los Alamos' transportation needs for both the Trinity and Alberta projects, thus, Oxnard Field was transferred from the jurisdiction of the Army Air Corps to the U.S. Army Service Forces Chief of Engineer District, and thereafter, assigned to the Manhattan Engineer District. In July 1945, the forerunner of Sandia Laboratory, known as "Z" Division, was established at Oxnard Field to handle future weapons development, testing, and bomb assembly for the Manhattan Engineer District. The District-directive calling for establishing a secure area and construction of "Z" Division facilities referred to this as "Sandia Base" , after the nearby Sandia Mountains – apparently the first official recognition of the "Sandia" name.

Sandia Laboratory was operated by the University of California until 1949, when President Harry S. Truman asked Western Electric, a subsidiary of American Telephone and Telegraph (AT&T), to assume the operation as an "opportunity to render an exceptional service in the national interest." Sandia Corporation, a wholly owned subsidiary of Western Electric, was formed on October 5, 1949, and, on November 1, 1949, took over management of the Laboratory.

In 1979, the United States Congress designated Sandia Laboratories as a DOE National laboratory, hence becoming the Sandia National Laboratories. In October 1993, Sandia National Laboratories (SNL) was managed and operated by Sandia Corporation, a wholly owned subsidiary of Lockheed Martin. In December 2016, it was announced that National Technology and Engineering Solutions of Sandia, under the direction of Honeywell International, would take over the management of Sandia National Laboratories beginning May 1, 2017; this contract remains in effect as of November 2022, covering government-owned facilities in Albuquerque, New Mexico (SNL/NM); Livermore, California (SNL/CA); Tonopah, Nevada; Shoreview, Minnesota; and Kauaʻi, Hawaii. SNL/NM is the headquarters and the largest laboratory, employing more than 17,000 employees, while SNL/CA is a smaller laboratory, with around 1,700 employees. Tonopah and Kauaʻi are occupied on a "campaign" basis, as test schedules dictate. The lab also managed the DOE/SNL Scaled Wind Farm Technology (SWiFT) Facility in Lubbock, Texas.

Sandia led a project that studied how to decontaminate a subway system in the event of a biological weapons attack (such as anthrax). As of September 2017, the process to decontaminate subways in such an event is "virtually ready to implement," said a lead Sandia engineer.

Sandia's integration with its local community includes a program through the Department of Energy's Tribal Energy program to deliver alternative renewable power to remote Navajo communities, spearheaded by senior engineer Sandra Begay.

== Lab directors and presidents ==
Lab directors and presidents
No.	Image	Name	Term start	Term end	Refs.
1		George Landry	October 1949	February 1952	
2		Donald A. Quarles	March 1952	August 1953	
3		James W. McRae	September 1953	September 1958	
4		Julius Molnar	October 1958	August 1960	
5		Siegmund P. "Monk" Schwartz	September 1960	October 1966	
6		John A. Hornbeck	November 1966	September 1972	
7		Morgan Sparks	October 1972	July 1981	
8		George C. Dacey	August 1981	January 1986	
9		Irwin Welber	February 1986	March 1989	
10		Albert Narath	1989	1995	
11		C. Paul Robinson	August 1995	April 28, 2005	
12		Thomas Hunter	April 29, 2005	July 8, 2010	
13		Paul Hommert	July 9, 2010	July 16, 2015	
14		Jill M. Hruby	July 17, 2015	April 30, 2017	
15		Stephen Younger	May 1, 2017	December 31, 2019	
16		James S. Peery	January 1, 2020	April 30, 2025	
17		Laura J. McGill	May 1, 2025	present	

== Legal issues ==
On February 13, 2007, a New Mexico State Court found Sandia Corporation liable for $4.7 million in damages for the firing of a former network security analyst, Shawn Carpenter, who had reported to his supervisors that hundreds of military installations and defense contractors' networks were compromised and sensitive information was being stolen – including hundreds of sensitive Lockheed documents on the Mars Reconnaissance Orbiter project. When his supervisors told him to drop the investigation and do nothing with the information, he went to intelligence officials in the United States Army and later the Federal Bureau of Investigation to address the national security breaches. When Sandia managers discovered his actions months later, they revoked his security clearance and fired him.

In 2014, an investigation determined Sandia Corp. used lab operations funds to pay for lobbying related to the renewal of its $2 billion contract to operate the lab. Sandia Corp. and its parent company, Lockheed Martin, agreed to pay a $4.8 million fine.

== Technical areas ==
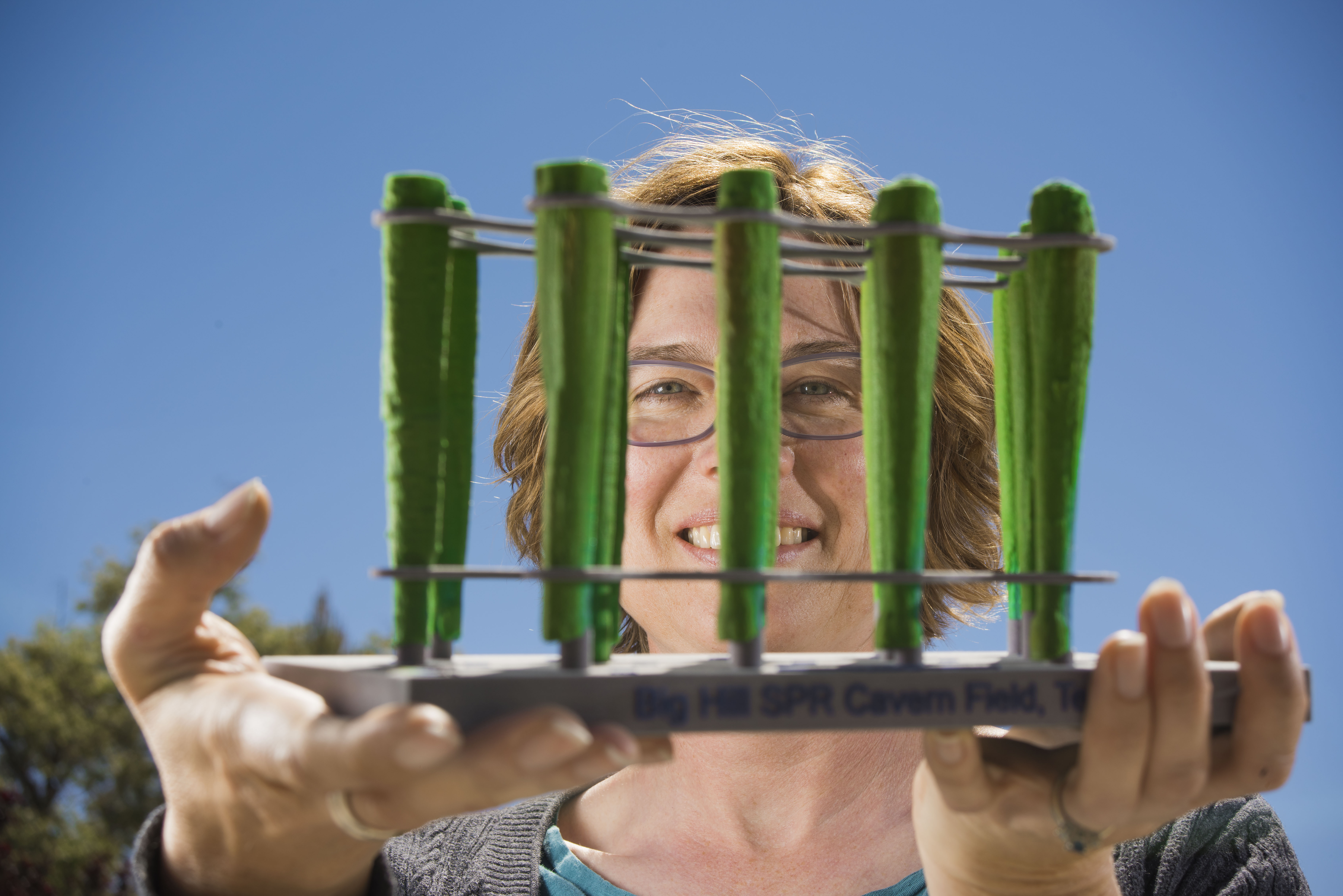
A researcher displays a model of the Big Hill cavern field in Texas, part of the nation's Strategic Petroleum Reserve.

SNL/NM consists of five technical areas (TA) and several additional test areas. Each TA has its own distinctive operations; however, the operations of some groups at Sandia may span more than one TA, with one part of a team working on a problem from one angle, and another subset of the same team located in a different building or area working with other specialized equipment. A description of each area is given below.

TA-I operations are dedicated primarily to three activities: the design, research, and development of weapon systems; limited production of weapon system components; and energy programs. TA-I facilities include the main library and offices, laboratories, and shops used by administrative and technical staff.

TA-II is a 45-acre (180,000 m^{2}) facility that was established in 1948 for the assembly of chemical high explosive main charges for nuclear weapons and later for production scale assembly of nuclear weapons. Activities in TA-II include the decontamination, decommissioning, and remediation of facilities and landfills used in past research and development activities. Remediation of the Classified Waste Landfill which started in March 1998, neared completion in FY2000. A testing facility, the Explosive Component Facility, integrates many of the previous TA-II test activities as well as some testing activities previously performed in other remote test areas. The Access Delay Technology Test Facility is also located in TA-II.

TA-III is adjacent to and south of TA-V [both are approximately seven miles (11 km) south of TA-I]. TA-III facilities include extensive design-test facilities such as rocket sled tracks, centrifuges and a radiant heat facility. Other facilities in TA-III include a paper destructor, the Melting and Solidification Laboratory and the Radioactive and Mixed Waste Management Facility (RMWMF). RMWMF serves as central processing facility for packaging and storage of low-level and mixed waste. The remediation of the Chemical Waste Landfill, which started in September 1998, is an ongoing activity in TA-III.

TA-IV, located approximately 1/2 mile (0.80 km) south of TA-I, consists of several inertial-confinement fusion research and pulsed power research facilities, including the High Energy Radiation Megavolt Electron Source (Hermes-III), the Z Facility, the Short Pulsed High Intensity Nanosecond X-Radiator (SPHINX) Facility, and the Saturn Accelerator. TA-IV also hosts some computer science and cognition research.

TA-V contains two research reactor facilities, an intense gamma irradiation facility (using cobalt-60 and caesium-137 sources), and the Hot Cell Facility.

SNL/NM also has test areas outside of the five technical areas listed above. These test areas, collectively known as Coyote Test Field, are located southeast of TA-III and/or in the canyons on the west side of the Manzanita Mountains. Facilities in the Coyote Canyon Test Field include the Solar Tower Facility (34.9623 N, 106.5097 W), the Lurance Canyon Burn Site and the Aerial Cable Facility.

=== DOE/SNL Scaled Wind Farm Technology (SWIFT) Facility ===
In collaboration with the Wind Energy Technologies Office (WETO) of U.S. Department of Energy, Texas Tech University, and the Vestas wind turbine corporation, SNL operates the Scaled Wind Farm Technology (SWiFT) Facility in Lubbock, Texas.

== Open-source software ==
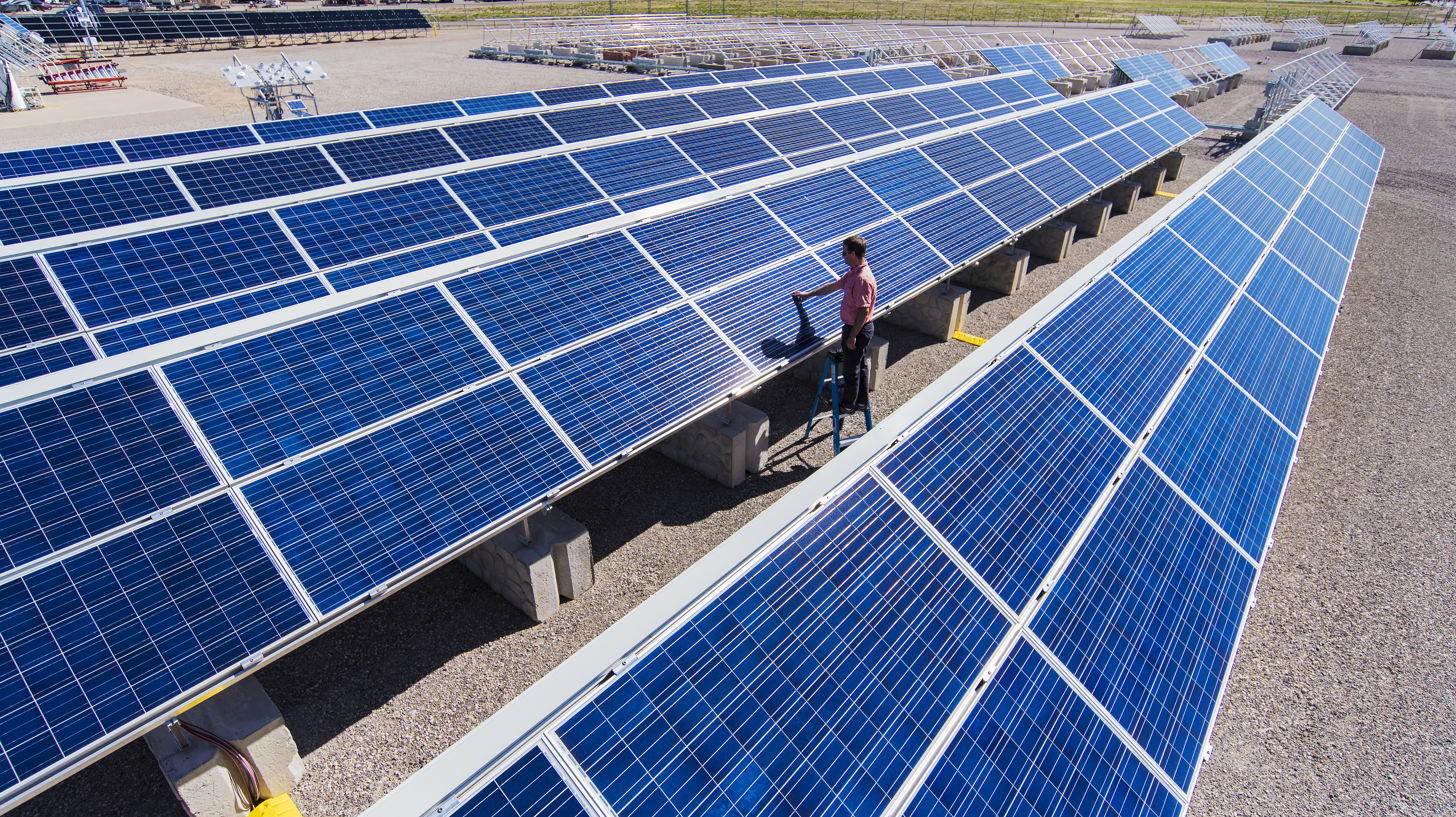
Solar panel testing

In the 1970s, the Sandia, Los Alamos, Air Force Weapons Laboratory Technical Exchange Committee initiated the development of the SLATEC library of mathematical and statistical routines, written in FORTRAN 77.

Today, Sandia National Laboratories is home to several open-source software projects:

- DICe (Digital Image Correlation Engine) is an open-source digital image correlation (DIC) toolset used for measuring full-field displacements and strains from sequences of digital images, as well as tracking rigid body motion. It is primarily developed for materials testing and experimental mechanics applications, supporting both 2D and stereo-DIC capabilities across multiple platforms (Windows, Linux, and Mac). The software is written in C++ and distributed under a BSD-like license.
- FCLib (Feature Characterization Library) is a library for the identification and manipulation of coherent regions or structures from spatio-temporal data. FCLib focuses on providing data structures that are "feature-aware" and support feature-based analysis. It is written in C and developed under a "BSD-like" license.
- LAMMPS (Large-scale Atomic/Molecular Massively Parallel Simulator) is a molecular dynamics library that can be used to model parallel atomic/subatomic processes at large scale. It is produced under the GNU General Public License (GPL) and distributed on the Sandia National Laboratories website as well as SourceForge.
- LibVMI is a library for simplifying the reading and writing of memory in running virtual machines, a technique known as virtual machine introspection. It is licensed under the GNU Lesser General Public License.
- MapReduce-MPI Library is an implementation of MapReduce for distributed-memory parallel machines, utilizing the Message Passing Interface (MPI) for communication. It is developed under a modified Berkeley Software Distribution license.
- MultiThreaded Graph Library (MTGL) is a collection of graph-based algorithms designed to take advantage of parallel, shared-memory architectures such as the Cray XMT, Symmetric Multiprocessor (SMP) machines, and multi-core workstations. It is developed under a BSD License.
- ParaView is a cross-platform application for performing data analysis and visualization. It is a collaborative effort, developed by Sandia National Laboratories, Los Alamos National Laboratories, and the United States Army Research Laboratory, and funded by the Advanced Simulation and Computing Program. It is developed under a BSD license.
- Pyomo is a python-based optimization Mathematical Programming Language which supports most commercial and open-source solver engines.
- Soccoro, a collaborative effort with Wake Forest and Vanderbilt Universities, is object-oriented software for performing electronic-structure calculations based on density-functional theory. It utilizes libraries such as MPI, BLAS, and LAPACK and is developed under the GNU General Public License.
- Titan Informatics Toolkit is a collection of cross-platform libraries for ingesting, analyzing, and displaying scientific and informatics data. It is a collaborative effort with Kitware, Inc., and uses various open-source components such as the Boost Graph Library. It is developed under a New BSD license.
- Trilinos is an object-oriented library for building scalable scientific and engineering applications, with a focus on linear algebra techniques. Most Trilinos packages are licensed under a Modified BSD License.
- Xyce is an open source, SPICE-compatible, high-performance analog circuit simulator, capable of solving extremely large circuit problems.
- Charon is a TCAD simulator which was open-sourced by Sandia in 2020. It is significant as previously there were no major TCAD simulators for large-scale simulations that were open source.
- Tracktable is a Sandia-developed open source platform for processing, analyzing, and visualizing the paths of moving objects (trajectories).

In addition, Sandia National Laboratories collaborates with Kitware, Inc. in developing the Visualization Toolkit (VTK), a cross-platform graphics and visualization software suite. This collaboration has focused on enhancing the information visualization capabilities of VTK and has in turn fed back into other projects such as ParaView and Titan.

== Self-guided bullet ==
On January 30, 2012, Sandia announced that it successfully test-fired a self-guided dart that can hit targets at 2,000 m (2,187 yd). The dart is 4 in (100 mm) long, has its center of gravity at the nose, and is made to be fired from a small-caliber smoothbore gun. It is kept straight in flight by four electromagnetically actuated fins encased in a plastic puller sabot that falls off when the dart leaves the bore. The dart cannot be fired from conventional rifled barrels because the gyroscopic stability provided by rifling grooves for regular bullets would prevent the self-guided bullet from reliably turning towards a target when in flight, so fins are responsible for stabilizing rather than spinning. A laser designator marks a target, which is tracked by the dart's optical sensor and 8-bit CPU. Its small size allows it to make corrections quickly without an inertial measurement unit, which keeps its cost down. The natural body frequency of the bullet is about 30 hertz, so corrections can be made 30 times per second in flight. Muzzle velocity with commercial gunpowder is 2,400 ft/s (730 m/s) (Mach 2.1), but military customized gunpowder can increase its speed and range. Computer modeling shows that a standard bullet would miss a target at 1,000 m (1,094 yd) by 9.8 yd (9 m), while an equivalent guided bullet would hit within 8 in (20 cm). Accuracy increases as distances get longer, since the bullet's motions settle more the longer it is in flight.

== Supercomputers ==
Since 1990s, the Sandia National Laboratories has been home and site of high-performance and supercomputers in the United States:

- Intel Paragon XP/S 140, 1993 to ?
- ASCI Red, 1997 to 2006
- Red Storm, 2005 to 2012
- Cielo, 2010 to 2016
- Trinity, 2015 to current
- Astra, 2018 to current, based on ARM processors
- Attaway, 2019 to current

== See also ==
- Brookhaven National Laboratory
- Decontamination foam
- Jess (programming language)
- Lawrence Livermore National Laboratory
- National Renewable Energy Laboratory
- Test Readiness Program
- Titan Rain
- VxInsight
