= Robert Wright Jr. =

FBI agent

Robert G. Wright Jr. is an FBI agent who has criticized the FBI's counterterrorist activities in the 1990s, when he worked in the Chicago division on terrorists with links to the Middle East, especially on the issue of money laundering. Specifically, he worked on project Vulgar Betrayal, which allegedly implicated Yasin al-Qadi. He wrote a detailed book which the FBI prevented him from publishing with threats of criminal prosecution. He complained that "FBI management intentionally and repeatedly thwarted and obstructed my attempts to launch a more comprehensive investigation to identify and neutralize terrorists."

Three months before the September 11 attacks, he wrote the following:

"Knowing what I know, I can confidently say that until the investigative responsibilities for terrorism are removed from the FBI, I will not feel safe. The FBI has proven for the past decade it cannot identify and prevent acts of terrorism against the United States and it's [sic] citizens at home and abroad. Even worse, there is virtually no effort on the part of the FBI's international terrorism unit to neutralize known and suspected terrorists residing within the United States."

After his revelations circa 2002–2003 he was demoted.

On May 6, 2009, Judge Gladys Kessler issued a ruling allowing Wright to publish his manuscript. Wright is focused on fighting the system of prepublication review and censorship of government employee writings.

Other FBI agents who supported Wright's allegations were John Vincent and Barry Carmody.

== See also ==
- Yasin al-Qadi (Financier)
- Coleen Rowley (FBI Whistleblower)
- Sibel Edmonds (FBI Whistleblower)
- National Security Whistleblowers Coalition
- The Shadow Factory (Other information on the FBI terrorism work pre-9/11)
- Judith Miller (journalist)
- The Feeling of Being Watched
