= Stakkato =

Hacker

Philip Gabriel Pettersson, known by the alias Stakkato, is a Swedish hacker and the alleged perpetrator of a worldwide cyber attack known to have occurred from at least December 2003 until May 2005, targeting many sites on the Internet including the US Military, White Sands Missile Range, NASA, a number of US academic institutions (known to include Caltech, Stanford University, San Diego Supercomputer Center, and UIUC), and a number of non-US academic institutions (known to include Uppsala University in Sweden and University College Cork in Ireland) and several other Internet locations.

By using locally based kernel exploits (a sophisticated technique that requires a high knowledge level and advanced development skills), Stakkato managed to elevate its user privileges and gain control of various systems within numerous government agencies and private sector enterprises.

Via stolen login credentials Stakkato was able to gain access to these systems for well over two years. Finally, Stakkato was able to gain access to Cisco Corporation's router internetwork operating system (IOS) source code, which enabled the attacker to develop custom exploits, rootkits (backdoors), and enhanced control of routers around the world.

Pettersson from Uppsala, Sweden, then 16 years old, was questioned over the attack in March 2005, while possible accomplices were searched in Sweden, Britain, and elsewhere in Europe. Pettersson was indicted with five felonies in May 2009, and in February 2010 his prosecution was transferred to Swedish authorities.

== See also ==
- Byzantine Foothold
- Moonlight Maze
- Solar Sunrise
- Titan Rain
