= Concerned Foreign Service Officers =

Concerned Foreign Service Officers (CFSO) is a group of current and former Foreign Service and Civil Service employees of the U.S. Department of State, cofounded by William Savich and Daniel M. Hirsch, created to investigate, document and expose alleged misuse of the security clearance process by the State Department's Diplomatic Security Service (DSS).

CFSO's concern is the possibility that the clearance process can be used to circumvent Federal personnel regulations, to bypass equal employment opportunity laws and to punish dissenters and whistle blowers within the agency.

The group investigates and documents allegations of improper and coercive interview techniques, fraudulent statements in investigative reports, suppression or destruction of evidence, improper seizure of personal property, misapplication of security regulations and similar allegations in relation to DSS cases.

The group considers that such acts would threaten the national security of the United States by reducing the reliability and integrity of DSS operations and by inhibiting the expression of dissenting views within the Foreign Service. Concerned Foreign Service Officers is allied with the National Security Whistle Blowers Coalition.

== Related links ==
- US Newswire Press Release
- US Newswire Press Release
- US Newswire Press Release
- Advance Health Magazine Article
- CS Monitor article
- National Security Whistle Blowers Coalition
- Concerned Foreign Service Officers website
- Concerned Foreign Service Officer's sponsored blog
