= Aldric Saucier =

American scientist and whistleblower

- Born: April 29, 1936; Maine, U.S.
- Died: December 8, 2016 (aged 80); Fairfax, Virginia, U.S.
- Occupation: Scientist

Aldric Saucier (April 29, 1936 – December 8, 2016) was an American scientist and whistleblower. Saucier lost his job and security clearance after he criticized the Strategic Defense Initiative in 1992.

== Early life ==
Aldric Saucier was born on April 29, 1936, in Maine.

== Career ==
Saucier started his career as a navigator with the United States Army Air Corps. In 1969, he worked on Apollo 11. He also worked on "the Ballistic Missile Defense Ground based free electron laser in 1983 and the Star Wars Program in 1991."

In October 1986, while working on the Strategic Defense Initiative (also known as Star Wars), Saucier sent a letter of complaint to James A. Abrahamson, alleging a pattern of "mismanagement and abuse," as well as "wasteful spending on research and development." By 1987, he was demoted. In February 1992, he was dismissed on the grounds of poor performance. His mental health was also "question[ed]" by his detractors, and he was surveilled by the Federal Bureau of Investigation. However, Democratic Congressman John Conyers believed it was done in retaliation, and he asked Army Secretary Michael P. W. Stone to overturn the dismissal, which he did. By March 1992, the allegations were reviewed by Defense Secretary Dick Cheney, and Saucier was given whistleblower protection. By April 1992, his security clearance was revoked after the Army found an error on a form he had filled out in 1969, where it was claimed he had graduated from UCLA instead of simply attending classes there.

Saucier was represented by the Government Accountability Project.

In 1996, Saucier ran for Congress in Maine's 2nd district as an independent. He came in third with 4.7% of the vote, in a race that was won by incumbent Democrat John Baldacci.

== Personal life and death ==
Saucier resided in Fort Fairfield, Maine, until he moved to Fairfax, Virginia, where he died on December 8, 2016, at age 80.
