= Julius Molnar =

American physicist

Julius P. Molnar (February 23, 1916 – January 11, 1973) was an American physicist who served as the fourth president of Sandia Corporation (a subsidiary of Bell Labs which managed the Sandia Laboratory).

== Early life and career ==
Molnar was born in Detroit, Michigan on February 23, 1916, and graduated from Oberlin College with a B.A. in physics in 1937. He received a PhD in physics from Massachusetts Institute of Technology in 1940. He joined Bell Labs in 1945, where he served in a variety of technical and management roles, including Director of Electron Tube Development (1955) and Director of Military Systems (1957). From October 1958 to August 1960, he served as president of Sandia Corporation (which managed the Sandia Laboratory) and vice president of Western Electric (a subsidiary of Bell Labs). He was elected to the National Academy of Engineering in 1969.
