= All Circuit Review Extension Act =

- Long title: To amend title 5, United States Code, to extend the period of certain authority with respect to judicial review of Merit Systems Protection Board decisions relating to whistleblowers, and for other purposes.
- Announced in: the 113th United States Congress
- Sponsored by: Rep. Elijah E. Cummings (D, MD-7)
- Number of co-sponsors: 4

Citations
- Public law: Pub. L. 113–170 (text) (PDF)
- Statutes at Large: 128 Stat. 1894

Codification
- U.S.C. sections amended: 5 U.S.C. § 7703

Legislative history
- Introduced in the House as H.R. 4197 by Rep. Elijah E. Cummings (D, MD-7) on March 11, 2014; Committee consideration by United States House Committee on Oversight and Government Reform, United States House Committee on the Judiciary, United States House Judiciary Subcommittee on Regulatory Reform, Commercial and Antitrust Law; Passed the House on July 14, 2014 (voice vote); Passed the Senate on September 11, 2014 (unanimous consent); Signed into law by President Barack Obama on September 26, 2014

The All Circuit Review Extension Act (H.R. 4197; Pub. L. 113–170 (text) (PDF)) is an Act that extended for three years the authority for federal employees who appeal a judgment of the Merit Systems Protection Board (MSPB) to file their appeal at any federal court, instead of only the U.S. Court of Appeals. This was a pilot program established in the Whistleblower Protection Enhancement Act of 2012 to last only two years.

The bill was introduced into the United States House of Representatives during the 113th United States Congress. The bill was signed into law.

== Background ==
The pilot program was established in the Whistleblower Protection Enhancement Act of 2012 (WPEA) to last only two years. The Government Accountability Project (GAP) calls the program "landmark" and says that it was "the WPEA's most significant structural reform."

== Provisions of the bill ==
This summary is based largely on the summary provided by the Congressional Research Service, a public domain source.

The All Circuit Review Extension Act extended from two to five years after the effective date of the Whistleblower Protection Enhancement Act of 2012 (i.e., December 27, 2012), the period allowed for: (1) filing a petition for judicial review of Merit Systems Protection Board decisions in whistleblower cases, and (2) any review of such a decision by the Director of the Office of Personnel Management (OPM).

== Congressional Budget Office report ==
This summary is based largely on the summary provided by the Congressional Budget Office, as ordered reported by the House Committee on Oversight and Government Reform on March 12, 2014. This is a public domain source.

The Congressional Budget Office (CBO) estimates that enacting H.R. 4197 would have no significant effect on the federal budget. The legislation could affect direct spending by agencies not funded through the annual appropriations (such as the Tennessee Valley Authority); therefore, pay-as-you-go procedures apply. CBO estimates, however, that any net increase in spending by those agencies would not be significant. Enacting the bill would not affect revenues.

H.R. 4197 would extend for three years the authority for federal employees who appeal a judgment of the Merit Systems Protection Board (MSPB) to file their appeal at any federal court, instead of only the U.S. Court of Appeals. Based on information from MSPB and the Office of Special Counsel, CBO expects that allowing appeals to be filed in any federal circuit would lead to a small increase in the administrative burden of the MSPB and federal agencies. We estimate, however, that the costs associated with that increase would not be significant.

H.R. 4197 contains no intergovernmental or private-sector mandates as defined in the Unfunded Mandates Reform Act and would impose no costs on state, local, or tribal governments.

== Procedural history ==
The Al Circuit Review Extension Act was introduced on March 11, 2014, by Rep. Elijah E. Cummings (D, MD-7). The bill was referred to the United States House Committee on Oversight and Government Reform, the United States House Committee on the Judiciary, and the United States House Judiciary Subcommittee on Regulatory Reform, Commercial and Antitrust Law. On July 14, 2014, it was reported alongside House Report 113-519 part 1. The House voted on July 14, 2014, to pass the bill in a voice vote.

== Debate and discussion ==
The organization Government Accountability Project (GAP) supported the legislation, arguing that an extension of the pilot program was needed in order to ensure that the Government Accountability Office (GAO) and Congress had enough time to see the results of the program before deciding whether to make it permanent.

Federal Employed Women (FEW) and the Make It Safe Coalition supported the passage of the bill. They argued that "all circuit review is a sorely needed provision to ensure that the WPEA is enforced as Congress intended" because "during its 1982-2012 monopoly the Federal Circuit rewrote and gutted congressionally-passed whistleblower rights repeatedly." The Coalition reported that "the Federal Circuit had a 3-226 record against whistleblowers for decisions on the merits since October 1994, making it all but impossible for a whistleblower to prevail in court."

Rep. Elijah Cummings, who introduced the bill, said that this program is important to extend because it "allows whistleblowers to file appeals where they live rather than being limited to the Federal Circuit Court of Appeals." He also said that the Federal Circuit Court of Appeals has "an abysmal track record in whistleblower cases."

Rep. Darrell Issa also supported the bill, arguing that "whistleblowers are a critical asset for congressional oversight" and that extending the pilot program would give Congress "more time to gauge the impact of an 'all circuit' review."

== See also ==
- List of bills in the 113th United States Congress
- Whistleblower protection in the United States
