= Laura McGill =

American weapons engineer

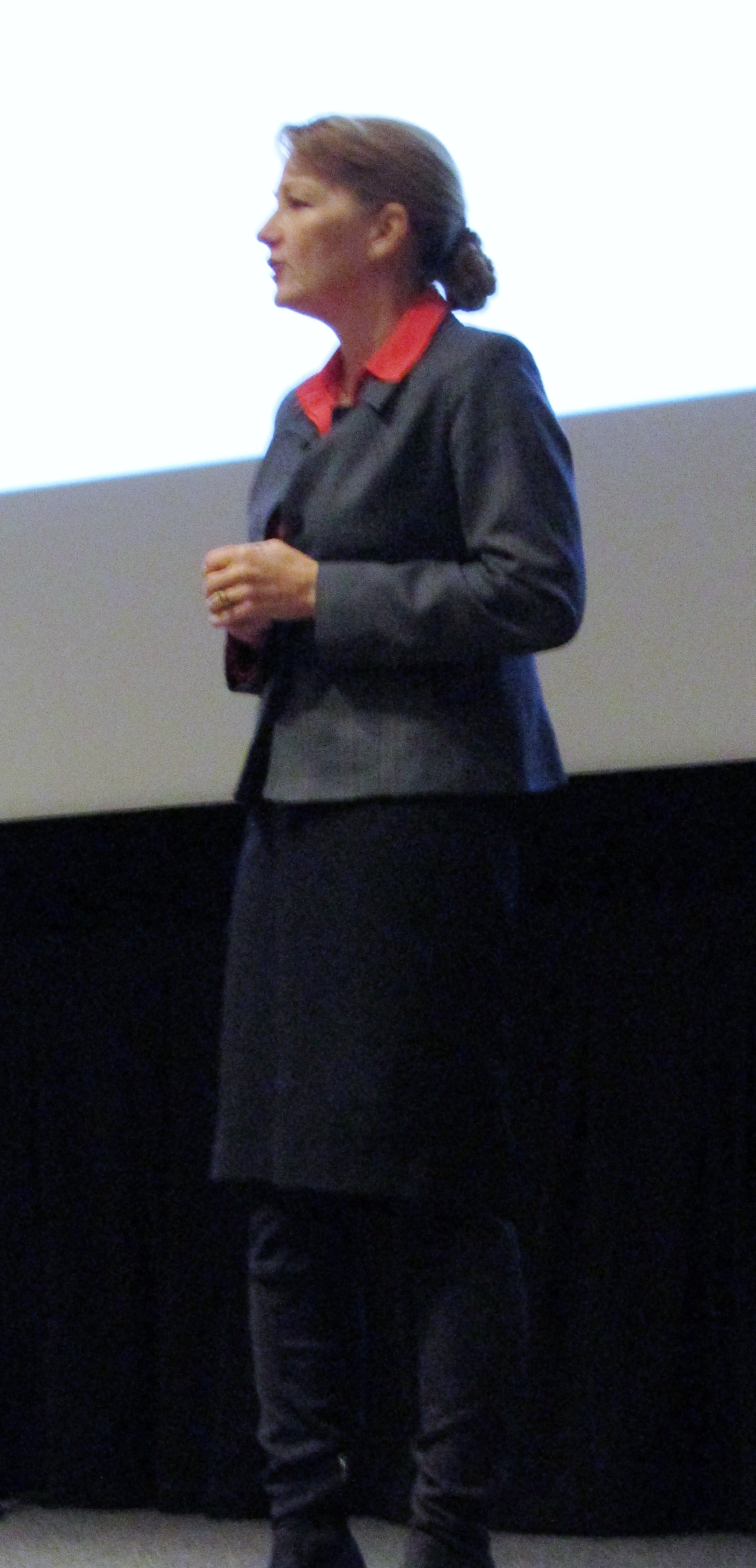
Laura McGill in 2018 speaking at BYU's Joseph Smith Building auditorium.

Laura J. McGill is an American aerospace engineer and the current director of the Sandia National Laboratories (SNL). She has previously served in capacity as chief technology officer and deputy director for nuclear deterrence, where her work includes "nuclear weapons modernization" and working to "assure the reliability of the existing stockpile". She is a former president of the American Institute of Aeronautics and Astronautics (AIAA).

== Education and career ==
McGill majored in aeronautical and astronautical engineering at the University of Washington, graduating in 1983. She received a master's degree in aerospace systems from for-profit West Coast University in 1992.

McGill worked for Raytheon as chief engineer for air warfare systems, vice president of engineering for Raytheon Missile Systems, and deputy vice president of engineering for Raytheon Missiles & Defense. At Raytheon, she became a Raytheon Principal Fellow in 2010. She moved to Sandia in 2021, and served as AIAA president from 2022 to 2024.

On May 1, 2025, she became director of Sandia National Laboratories.

== Recognition ==
McGill was named as a Fellow of the AIAA in 2007. She was elected to the National Academy of Engineering in 2019, "for technical leadership of missile systems for the United States and its allies".
