= VxInsight =

VxInsight is a knowledge mining tool developed by Sandia National Laboratories with the Institute for Scientific Information. It allows the user to visualize the relationship between groups of objects in large databases as a 3D landscape.

In what Hillier et al. call a "pioneering study," VxInsight has been used to analyze gene expression (i.e. microarray) data across a number of conditions in C. elegans. Using VxInsight, Kim et al. were able to cluster genes into "mounts" with coherent functions, and were also able to make novel observations, such as the finding that distinct classes of transposons (such as Tc3 and Mariner transposons) appear to be differentially regulated during development.
