= Stanley Hilton =

American author and conspiracy theorist

Stanley G. Hilton is an author and former attorney from San Francisco.

Hilton filed a $7 billion class action lawsuit, in 2002, against United States President George W. Bush, members of his administration (including Condoleezza Rice, Dick Cheney, Donald Rumsfeld) and others. The lawsuit was composed of 400 plaintiffs, including 14 families of 9/11 victims, with two named plaintiffs representing the class. The lawsuit alleged Bush administration complicity in allowing the September 11, 2001 attacks. The case was dismissed on Dec 30, 2004, with the judge ruling that US citizens do not have any right to sue a sitting president, based on the Doctrine of Sovereign Immunity; that the lawsuit "presents a non-justicable political question;" that the plaintiffs "lack standing to sue on behalf of all taxpayers;" that the plaintiffs "failed to establish the required causal connection between [their] alleged injuries and these defendants' conduct;" and that "deficiencies of the complaint could not be cured by amendment." In June 2012, he was disbarred from practicing law in California.

== Education and early life ==
Hilton is a native San Franciscan who graduated from Lowell High School (1967) in San Francisco, University of Chicago (BA 1971 and graduate school 1971–72), Duke University School of Law (JD 1975), and Harvard Business School (MBA 1979). He also attended Oxford University (in England, 1970) and JFK School of Government at Harvard University (1984–85).

== Background ==
Stanley Hilton is also an author having written four books, including an unauthorized biography, Bob Dole, American Political Phoenix (1988); Senator for Sale (1995), another biography which purports to reflect Hilton's deep animus towards Dole, Glass Houses (1998), about congressional sex scandals; and To Pay or Not to Pay (2003).

Hilton is a resident of Hillsborough, California, and in 2009 he sued San Francisco International Airport, 62 foreign and domestic airlines, the Town of Hillsborough, and San Francisco and San Mateo Counties for jet noise and air pollution and public nuisance caused by reverse jet engine propulsion on takeoff from the Northeast runway at San Francisco International Airport. In 1995 he ran for Hillsborough school board.

Hilton has sued major banks for "predatory and fraudulent mortgage lending practices", accusing them of systematically bypassing and violating state and federal laws and being unable to prove assignment of loans. He has called for a complete collapse of the foreclosure "racket scam banking business" and called for its replacement by a new system of "Honest People's Banks."

== Disbarment ==
After several prior suspensions by the California State Bar, Hilton was disbarred from practicing law on June 16, 2012, for misconduct.

== See also ==
- U.S. government response to the September 11, 2001 attacks
- Sibel Edmonds
- David Ray Griffin
- Webster G. Tarpley
- 9/11 conspiracy theories
