= Shawn Carpenter =

American Navy veteran and whistleblower

Shawn R. Carpenter
- Occupations: Cyber security analyst and whistleblower

Shawn R. Carpenter is a cyber security analyst and whistleblower (previously employed by Sandia National Laboratories) who tracked down a Chinese cyberespionage ring that is code-named Titan Rain by the FBI. He came to national attention when his story was reported on in the September 5, 2005 issue of Time magazine.

== Early life ==
Carpenter served in the United States Navy for six years. It was also reported that he was a retired Army major.

== Titan Rain ==
=== Initial discovery ===
Carpenter was an employee of Sandia National Laboratories, investigating security breaches in its networks. However, upon tracking several breaches of Sandia, Lockheed Martin Corporation, Redstone Arsenal, and even NASA, dating back to 2003, Carpenter noticed patterns that began to appear to link the attacks to a single group. He was impressed by the meticulous, voracious, and swift manner (sometimes completed in less than 30 minutes) in which the hackers operated. Such observations led him to alert the federal government of his findings.

The Titan Rain hacking operation was first reported in an August 25, 2005 Washington Post article by Bradley Graham, which didn't mention Carpenter. Graham listed anonymous government officials as his sources.

=== Carpenter terminated by Sandia after refusing to drop issue ===
After informing his supervisors of the breaches, he was told that his only concern should be Sandia computers and to drop the issue. His employment was later terminated when Carpenter disobeyed his management and communicated the information about the security breaches first to United States Army Cyber Counterintelligence Special Agents. They verified his report and later brought in the FBI. The FBI requested a Senior DAC Counterintelligence agent known in the counterintelligence community by the nickname "Doc" to handle Carpenter and lead the operation on behalf of the FBI. For almost half a year, Carpenter was a confidential informant for the FBI before Sandia discovered his actions. Carpenter reportedly felt betrayed by the termination, as he viewed his actions as a service to his country, similar to his previous military service.

According to Carpenter, during his termination hearing at Sandia, Bruce Held, Sandia's chief of counterintelligence, yelled,"[you're] lucky you have such understanding management... if you worked for me, I would decapitate you! There would at least be blood all over the office!" During the subsequent court case, Held testified that he did use the word "decapitate" and, while he did not recall using the word "blood," would not contest it. He also apologized.

=== Carpenter sues Sandia ===
Carpenter sued Sandia National Laboratories for wrongful termination and defamation; a jury awarded him almost $4.7 million in compensatory and punitive damages on February 13, 2007. The jury more than doubled the punitive damages requested by Carpenter's attorneys Thad Guyer, Stephani Ayers, and Philip Davis. The 13-person New Mexico state district court jury determined that Sandia's handling of Shawn Carpenter's termination was "malicious, willful, reckless, wanton, fraudulent or in bad faith." Juror Ed Dzienis said, "If they (Sandia) have an interest in protecting us, they certainly didn't show it with the way they handled Shawn." Alex Scott, the jury forewoman, said jurors were upset by the lack of documentation of the process and by the "reckless behavior on the part of Sandia to not have adequate policies in place for employees about hacking, and the cavalier attitude about national security and global security."

Carpenter's wife, Dr. Jennifer Jacobs, testified at the trial. Jacobs, a former Sandia scientist, nuclear engineer, West Point graduate, and Army Reserve Major, said Sandia management questioned her loyalty to the company after her husband was fired. Jacobs left Sandia and was later appointed as a White House Fellow, and was a director at the United States National Security Council. In an interview with the Albuquerque Journal, Jacobs stated, "The point for us all along was this is bad for the country to have contractors like Sandia Corporation behaving this way -- with impunity. And if other citizens don't do this, it's the beginning of the end for our country. That's what we kept coming back to: This is what we have to do, because it's what we expect of others."

As of March 2007, Carpenter is employed at NetWitness Corporation, a startup headed by Amit Yoran, former director of the National Cyber Security Division within the United States Department of Homeland Security.

=== Sandia appeals verdict, then drops appeal ===
In March 2007, Sandia National Laboratories retained three additional attorneys at the international corporate defense firm of Baker Botts. In post-trial motions, Sandia's attorneys unsuccessfully argued to throw out the jury verdict, to reduce the judgment to zero, and for a new trial. Carpenter's attorneys successfully argued a motion for post-judgment interest. During the appeals process, Sandia was ordered to pay an interest rate of 15% per year on the final judgment of $4,742,146.66 (plus attorney fees).

On October 14, 2007, The Albuquerque Journal published a story ("Analyst, Sandia Settle Suit") that stated that Sandia had dropped its appeal of the verdict. According to the story, the judgment had been accumulating 15 percent interest since the verdict in his favor in February 2007. The piece also related that Carpenter continues to work in the national security area for clients in the intelligence community, federal agencies, and the military.

== See also ==
- Timeline of Cox Report controversy
- Cyber-warfare
- National Security Whistleblowers Coalition
