= Sandra Begay =

American mechanical engineer

- Education: University of New Mexico (BS); Stanford University (MS)
- Scientific career
- Fields: Mechanical engineering
- Workplaces: Sandia National Laboratories

Sandra K. Begay is an American/Navajo Nation mechanical engineer who designs research and development systems at Sandia National Laboratories in Albuquerque, New Mexico. In 2020, she was honored by the American Indian Science and Engineering Society's Indigenous Excellence Award. She is known for her work expanding energy access through alternative and renewable solutions for remote tribal members on the Navajo Reservation.

== Education ==
Begay earned her BS in civil engineering from the University of New Mexico (UNM) and her MS in structural engineering from Stanford University. Begay chose Stanford for its noted American Indian community. She has been honored as the 2000 Stanford Alumni of the Year, 2005 UNM Distinguished Alumnus, and 2007 UNM Zia Alumnus.

== Career ==
She has worked at major US government laboratories including the Lawrence Livermore, Los Alamos, and Sandia National Laboratories. In the early 2000s, Begay worked to provide local solar renewable energy systems to remote members of the Navajo Nation, working through the Department of Energy Tribal Program, helping the Nation to bring power to hundreds of members. Of her work with the program, Begay said "I get to work with my own native people. I give them a new way to think about having electricity. It's very nurturing."

Begay is known for her mentorship to American Indian engineering students, particularly in the energy sector. Previous interns in programs she has developed have spoken highly of her support and teaching, and many are now highly regarded industry professionals.

In 2009, Begay was honored by the American Indian Science and Engineering Society's Ely S. Parker Lifetime Achievement Award. In 2020, she was also selected as a laureate of the Society's Indigenous Excellence professional award. Begay was also previously executive director of the society.

At the University of New Mexico, Begay was appointed to the Board of Regents by Michelle Lujan Grisham in 2019, and also currently chairs the Rainforest Innovations program. In 2019, she took a leave of absence from Sandia to serve as director of the Environmental Health Department of Albuquerque for mayor Tim Keller.
