= Government Accountability Project =

American whistleblower protection and advocacy organization

- Type: Non-profit organization
- Headquarters: Washington, D.C.
- Website: Whistleblower.org

The Government Accountability Project (GAP) is a nonprofit whistleblower protection and advocacy organization in the United States. It was founded in 1977 by the Institute for Policy Studies.

== Activities ==
In March 1983, the GAP worked with whistleblower Rick Parks to inform the Nuclear Regulatory Commission about alleged problems with cleanup procedures after the Three Mile Island accident. Parks also alleged his apartment had been broken into and drugs were planted in his van. This was popularized in the Netflix documentary Meltdown: Three Mile Island.

In 1992, the GAP represented Aldric Saucier, who had lost his job and security clearance after he criticized the Strategic Defense Initiative.

In December 2012, Eric Ben-Artzi came forward publicly with evidence of multi-billion dollar securities violations at his employer, Deutsche Bank. He internally reported violations stemming from the bank's failure to report the value of its credit derivatives portfolio accurately. The bank retaliated in multiple ways and ultimately dismissed him. the GAP filed an official whistleblower complaint on Ben-Artzi's behalf. He was ultimately awarded $8 million from the SEC, which he declined to collect.

GAP represented Thomas A. Drake, a former senior executive with the National Security Agency (NSA), until 2015 when his lawyer Jesselyn Radack resigned from GAP and he followed her to the Institute for Public Accuracy. He blew the whistle on multi-billion dollar programmatic fraud, waste, and abuse; the critical loss and suppression of 9/11 intelligence; and the Stellar Wind project's dragnet electronic mass surveillance and data-mining (conducted on a vast scale by the agency with the approval of the White House after 9/11). Drake argued that Stellar Wind violated the Constitution and American citizens' civil liberties while weakening national security. In April 2010, the Department of Justice charged him with 10 felonies (five under the Espionage Act) and he faced 35 years in prison. He was the first whistleblower to be charged under the Espionage Act by the Obama administration. All charges were eventually dropped when Drake pleaded to a minor misdemeanor for exceeding the authorized use of a government computer, with no fine or prison time. In the book Bravehearts, Tom Devine took credit for Drake's success. However, Drake later clarified that "Tom Devine was never my lawyer at GAP" and "the voice I had in the court of public opinion was Jesselyn Radack. She was my voice when I had none."

In 2003, Federal Air Marshal (FAM) Robert MacLean revealed a cost-cutting plan to cancel FAM coverage from long distance flights on the eve of a confirmed al-Qaeda suicidal hijacking plan. The plan never went into effect after Congress protested, based solely on his whistleblowing disclosure. TSA fired him three years later with a single charge of "Unauthorized Disclosure of Sensitive Security Information" – an unclassified "hybrid secrecy" label the TSA retroactively applied to the information that he disclosed. In January 2025, the U.S. Office of Special Counsel vindicated a number of MacLean's safety concerns.

Jim Schrier is a veteran food safety inspector for the US Department of Agriculture (USDA) who was retaliated against after reporting violations of humane handling regulations at an agency-regulated Tyson Foods slaughter plant in Iowa. Serving as an inspector for 29 years, Schrier reported the violations involving market hogs, which included inadequate stunning techniques and conscious animals being shackled and slaughtered, to his supervisor.

GAP represented Edward Snowden, a contractor with the National Security Agency (NSA), until 2015 when his lawyer Jesselyn Radack resigned from GAP and he followed her to the Institute for Public Accuracy. In early 2013, whistleblower Edward Snowden began working with journalists to reveal numerous mass surveillance programs conducted by the NSA. Articles based on Snowden's documents revealed the existence of global surveillance programs run by the NSA with the cooperation of telecommunication companies and European governments. In June 2013, Snowden became the sixth whistleblower charged under the Espionage Act by the Obama administration.

As an officer at the U.N. peacekeeping operation in Kosovo in 2007, James Wasserstrom blocked an alleged conspiracy to pay a $500 million kickback to senior U.N. and Kosovo officials in connection with the construction of a new coal mine and power plant. The UN Dispute Tribunal (UNDT) found he was subjected to serious and protracted retaliation which he faced without protection from the U.N. Ethics Office – the unit established to investigate and act against such reprisals. Wasserstrom faced relentless negative personal and professional consequences of the retaliation, while none of those who engaged in it suffered consequences themselves. He has since lobbied Congress successfully to strengthen State Department oversight of UN whistleblower protections

In early 2007, the GAP was responsible for exposing fraud and abuse at the highest levels of the World Bank. In May 2007, World Bank President Paul Wolfowitz left the international organization in the wake of wide-ranging scandals based on multiple releases of documents over the previous two months by the GAP. Released evidence and exposed information showed that: Wolfowitz's companion, Shaha Riza, received salary raises far in excess of those allowable under Bank rules; Riza received a questionable consulting position with a US defense contractor in 2003 at Wolfowitz' direction that has resulted in State and Defense Department inquiries; Juan José Daboub, Bank Managing Director and Wolfowitz-hire, attempted to remove references and funding for "family planning" in Bank projects; Wolfowitz' office was responsible for weakening a "climate change" strategy document; Bank Senior Management delayed reporting to Bank staff that a fellow staffer had been seriously wounded in a shooting in Iraq; World Bank lending to Africa during Fiscal Year of 2007 has plummeted; and Wolfowitz was trying to broaden the Bank's portfolio in Iraq over Board opposition.

In 2016, the GAP represented World Bank whistleblower Fabrice Houdart when the Bank opened an investigation in his human rights advocacy after he obtained from Jim Yong Kim that he withdraw an unethical bonus awarded to CFO Bertrand Badre.

== The Democracy Protection Initiative ==
The Democracy Protection Initiative was launched by the GAP in October 2020. The initiative aimed to encourage and provide support to whistleblowers who came forward with information relating to alleged interference in the 2020 United States elections and during a potential subsequent transition of power. Partners in the initiative included the American Constitution Society, American Oversight, Citizens for Responsibility and Ethics in Washington, Georgetown Law's Institute for Constitutional Advocacy and Protection, Protect Democracy, Public Citizen, and We The Action.

== Legislation ==
The GAP advocated in favor of the All Circuit Review Extension Act, a bill that would extend for three years the authority for federal employees who appeal a judgment of the Merit Systems Protection Board (MSPB) to file their appeal at any federal court, instead of only the US Court of Appeals. The pilot program was established in the Whistleblower Protection Enhancement Act of 2012 (WPEA) to last only two years. The GAP called the program a "landmark" and said that it was "the WPEA's most significant structural reform", and argued that an extension of the program was needed in order to ensure that the Government Accountability Office (GAO) and Congress had enough time to see the results before deciding whether to make it permanent.
