= Tom Devine (lawyer) =

American whistleblower rights advocate

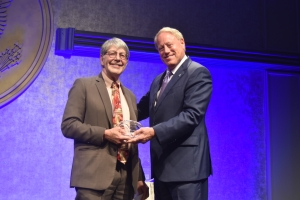
- Devine at the 2019 Coalition for Integrity award ceremony
- Born: Thomas M. Devine; June 21, 1951 (age 75); Elmwood, Illinois, U.S.
- Education: Georgetown University (BA); Antioch Law School (JD)
- Occupation: Legal Director of Government Accountability Project
- Known for: Whistleblower advocacy
- Notable work: The Corporate Whistleblower's Survival Guide

Tom Devine (born June 21, 1951) is an American lawyer, investigator, lobbyist, teacher, and advocate for whistleblower rights. He is currently the legal director at the non-profit Government Accountability Project, in Washington, D.C., where he has worked since 1979. He has assisted more than 7,000 whistleblowers, testified in Congress over 50 times, and has been a leader on the front lines to draft, enact, help to enact, or defend 34 whistleblower laws in the United States and abroad, including nearly all federal laws since 1978 and international rights ranging from former Soviet Bloc nations such as Kosovo, Serbia and Ukraine to the United Nations, World Bank, European Union, and Organization of American States.

He is also an adjunct professor at the District of Columbia School of Law, where he teaches classes on and supervises clinical programs in whistleblower protection.

== Early life and education ==
Devine was raised in a working-class family in Elmwood Park, Ill. His late father was an inspector for a phone company. Devine participated in the debate team at Arlington High School and later was an All-American debater at Georgetown University, where he captained the team that set a still unbroken record for tournament championships. He graduated cum laude and was inducted into Phi Beta Kappa. He enrolled in Antioch Law School in 1977 and, while a student, organized a legal clinic which sparked the survival and second generation of the whistleblower support organization, Government Accountability Project. After graduation in 1980, Devine assumed leadership of Government Accountability Project's substantive work, including litigation, investigations, legislative advocacy, media outreach, and grassroots public education.

== Whistleblower advocacy ==
Devine has been involved in successful campaigns to pass or defend 34 whistleblower laws or policies from the municipal to the international level, including:

- The Whistleblower Protection Act of 1989
- The Military Whistleblower Protection Act
- Jury trial rights for federal Department of Energy and Nuclear Regulatory Commission whistleblowers in the 2005 Energy Policy Act
- Corporate employee protection provisions creating a right to jury trial in the 2002 Sarbanes-Oxley law and 12other enacted corporate statutes
- Federal law requiring U.S. representatives to the World Bank and other multilateral development banks to create whistleblower policies equivalent to the Sarbanes Oxley law
- Congressional bans on nondisclosure agreements that imposed blanket prior restraint as a generic condition for receiving or retaining security clearances
- Washington state and Washington, D.C. whistleblower statutes that established new best practices at the state and municipal level
- United Nations precedents for international organizations stating employees may blow the whistle publicly, which ushered in free speech policies at the UN, World Bank, and African Development Bank
- Campaigns that stopped the defense and health industries from gutting the False Claims Act
- European Directive creating binding free speech rights for all 28 member nations.

He has called for improvements in Canada's whistleblower protection law, which he was quoted as calling “weaker than a cardboard shield” and “more like a tissue paper shield.”

== Controversies ==
Some clients claim that Devine largely works to benefit himself, often to the detriment of whistleblowers, including making them do their own research of caselaw or abandoning them right before a proceeding.

In April 2010, the Department of Justice charged Thomas A. Drake with 10 felonies (five under the Espionage Act) and he faced 35 years in prison. He was the first whistleblower to be charged under the Espionage Act by the Obama administration. All charges were eventually dropped when Drake pleaded to a minor misdemeanor for exceeding the authorized use of a government computer, with no fine or prison time. In the book Bravehearts, Tom Devine took credit for Drake's success. However, Drake later clarified that "Tom Devine was never my lawyer at GAP", and "the voice I had in the court of public opinion was Jesselyn Radack. She was my voice when I had none."

== Recognition and publications ==
- The Hugh Hefner First Amendment Award (Government) (1989)
- The National Magazine Award (Co-Winner, Public Interest) (1990)
- The American Bar Association's Top 20 Young Lawyers for "Making a Difference" (1990)
- The Fund for Constitutional Government's Defenders of the Constitution Award (1998)
- The Freedom Forum's Freedom of Information Hall of Fame (2006)
- Recognized annually since 2010 as one of The Washingtonian's Top Employment Lawyers
- International Business Book of the Year Award for The Corporate Whistleblower Survival Guide: A Handbook for Committing the Truth
- State Department staff nicknamed him the “Ambassador of Whistleblowing,” because he has represented the U.S. on speaking tours in a dozen nations and hosted countless international visitor delegations at the Government Accountability Project's Washington, D.C. office. He is on the Board of Whistleblowers International Network, the global coalition he helped found.
- 2019 Coalition for Integrity's special award recognizing all whistleblowers. Devine accepted the award at the 2019 ceremony on behalf of all whistleblowers.

Devine has authored or co-authored more than 45 books, law reviews, newspaper, syndicate, or magazine op-ed articles on First Amendment protection, constitutional torts, civil service law, the False Claims Act, scientific freedom, protection of national forests, meat and poultry inspection, mid-air collisions, nuclear power safety, and the Strategic Defense Initiative, among others. Some select publications include:

Caught Between Conscience and Career: How to Expose Abuses Without Exposing Your Identity, 2019, co-authored with staff from the Project on Government Oversight and Public Employees for Environmental Responsibility.

"The National Security Whistleblower's Tightrope: Legal Rights of Government Employees and Contractors." In Whistleblowers, Leaks, and the Media: The First Amendment and National Security, edited by Ellen Shearer, Paul S. Rosenzweig, and Timothy J. McNulty, 2014. Co-authored with Steven L. Katz

"The Key to Protection: Civil and Employment Law Remedies." International Handbook on Whistleblower Research, 2013. Co-authored with Paul Harpur and David Lewis.

The Corporate Whistleblower's Survival Guide: A Handbook for Committing the Truth (Berrett-Koeler Publishers), 2011. Co-authored with Tarek Maassarani.

"The Whistleblower Protection Act Burdens of Proof: Ground Rules for Credible Free Speech Rights." E-Journal of International and Comparative Labour Studies 2.3 (September–October 2013).

Running the Gauntlet: The Campaign for Credible Corporate Whistleblower Rights. The Government Accountability Project, 2008. Co-authored with Tarek Maassarani.

Challenging the Culture of Secrecy: A Status Report on Freedom of Speech at the World Bank, 2004. "The Whistleblower Statute Prepared for the Organization of American States and the Global Legal Revolution Protecting Whistleblowers." The George Washington International Law Review 857 (2003). Co-authored with Robert G. Vaughn and Keith Henderson.

The Art of Anonymous Activism. Fund for Constitutional Government, with staff from Public Employees for Environmental Responsibility (PEER) and the Project on Government Oversight (POGO), 2002.

"The Whistleblower Protection Act of 1989: Foundation for the Modern Law of Employment Dissent." Administrative Law Journal 51.2 (Spring 1999): 531-579.

"Secrecy and Accountability in Scientific Research." Forum for Allied Research and Public Policy 13.1 (Spring 1998): 65-70.

The Whistleblower Survival Guide: Courage without Martyrdom. Fund for Constitutional Government, 1997.

"Whistleblower Protection—The GAP between the Law and Reality." Howard Law Journal 223 (1988). Co-authored with Donald Aplin.

"Abuse of Authority: The Office of Special Counsel and Whistleblower Protection." Antioch Law Journal 4 (1986) 4: 5-71. Co-authoried with Donald Aplin.

Blueprint for Civil Service Reform, 1976, Fund for Constitutional Government
