= Robert MacLean =

U.S. Federal Air Marshal Service whistleblower

Robert J. MacLean
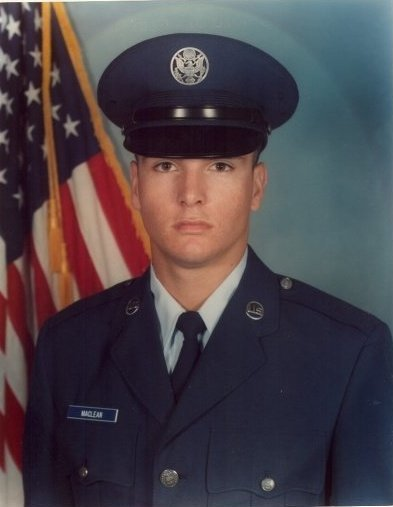
- Born: March 8, 1970 (age 56); Torrejón Air Base, Madrid, Spain
- Military career
- Allegiance: United States
- Branch: United States Air Force
- Service years: U.S. Air Force: 1988–1992 United States Border Patrol Agent: 1996-2001 U.S. Federal Air Marshal: 2001-2006, 2015-2019
- Rank: Senior Airman
- Unit: 44th Strategic Missile Wing

Robert J. MacLean (born March 8, 1970, in Torrejon Air Base, Spain) is a former United States Federal Air Marshal and whistleblower.

== Early career ==
MacLean served in the U.S. Air Force from 1988 to 1992. After his discharge, MacLean entered the United States Border Patrol as a border patrol agent. MacLean was recruited by the Federal Aviation Administration's Federal Air Marshal program immediately after the September 11 attacks. MacLean was in the first air marshal class to graduate after the September 11, 2001 attacks. After subsequently hiring a significant number of new air marshals, the FAA program was moved under the new Department of Homeland Security's Transportation Security Administration and called the Federal Air Marshal Service (FAMS).

== Whistleblowing ==
On July 28, 2003, MacLean disclosed to MSNBC a proposed TSA operational plan that he believed would have reduced aviation security: removing air marshals from long distance, nonstop flights to save on hotel costs.

MacLean said he previously brought his concerns to his TSA managers and a Department of Homeland Security Office of Inspector General field agent, but was rebuffed, leading him to make contact with national media. MacLean was quoted, anonymously, along with other unnamed sources, in a story written by Brock N. Meeks, chief Washington correspondent for MSNBC.com.

TSA first denied that air marshals would have been shifted, but the morning after MacLean's disclosure, the agency dropped the plan.

== TSA investigation and identification ==
In 2005, MacLean appeared on NBC Nightly News to criticize a TSA dress code that he believed made it too easy to identify air marshals. While the appearance was supposed to be anonymous, MacLean's voice was not distorted, and he was identified by TSA officials. MacLean then admitted to being the source of the 2003 disclosure as well.

== Firing by TSA and administrative appeals ==
MacLean was fired by the TSA on April 11, 2006, on the grounds that he disclosed prohibited security information. On August 31, 2006, more than six months after he was fired, the TSA retroactively marked MacLean's July 2003 disclosure as being Sensitive Security Information, an unclassified information category.

MacLean appealed this decision to the Merit Systems Protection Board (MSPB), but after the TSA issued its August 31, 2008 "Final Order on Sensitive Security Information," the agency argued that the MSPB had no jurisdiction to challenge an "Agency Order." The MSPB Administrative Judge dismissed the appeal without prejudice so MacLean could challenge the Agency Order in the United States Court of Appeals for the Ninth Circuit. On September 16, 2008, a Ninth Circuit panel ruled that the Transportation Security Administration was within its authority to retroactively classify the information as SSI, but found that MacLean could contest his termination before the MSPB under the authority of the Whistleblower Protection Act by arguing that he had a "good-faith belief" that the information did not qualify as "sensitive security information."

On June 22, 2009, a full MSPB panel declared that MacLean was not protected under the Whistleblower Protection Act. On May 12, 2010, MSPB administrative law judge Franklin M. Kang issued an Initial Decision to uphold MacLean's removal. MacLean appealed the decision to a three-member appellate MSPB panel in Washington DC, but on July 25, 2011, the full panel denied all of MacLean's Whistleblower Protection Act defenses and affirmed the TSA's decision to terminate him.

== Appellate and Supreme Court decisions ==
In 2013, a unanimous panel of three United States Court of Appeals for the Federal Circuit judges ruled in favor of MacLean, instructing the MSPB to reassess whether his disclosure qualified for whistleblower protection. The federal government appealed the Federal Circuit's decision to the Supreme Court of the United States. In January 2015, the Supreme Court upheld the Federal Circuit's decision, ruling that MacLean could pursue a whistleblower defense before the MSPB.

== Reinstatement and later dismissal ==
In the wake of the Supreme Court decision, the MSPB remanded McLean's case back to judge Kang for a new hearing, and on May 8, 2015, MacLean was retroactively reinstated by the Department of Homeland Security. Kang formally designated MacLean a whistleblower in November 2015. In March 2019 MacLean was fired again by the TSA, on the basis of allegations including inappropriate posts on a message board for air marshals and lying about how he obtained information about potential witnesses against him.
