= Cielo (supercomputer) =

United States supercomputer

- Operators: National Nuclear Security Administration
- Location: Los Alamos National Laboratory
- Architecture: Cray XE6 with Dual AMD Opteron™ 6136 eight-core “Magny-Cours” Socket G34 @ 2.4 GHz
- Power: 3.98 Mega Watts
- Space: 3000 square feet (278.7 m^{2})
- Memory: 286 terabytes DDR3 @ 1333 MHz
- Storage: 7.6 PB User Available Capacity
- Speed: 1,110 TF using 142,272 cores
- Cost: US$ 54M
- Ranking: TOP500: 6, 2011
- Purpose: Primarily utilized to perform milestone weapons calculations

Cielo was a United States supercomputer located at Los Alamos National Laboratory. Built by Cray Inc, the computer was part of the Advanced Simulation and Computing Program to maintain the United States nuclear stockpile.

From 31 March 2013, with the retirement of IBM Roadrunner, it took over as their front line computer. As of June 2014, it is ranked as number 32 on the TOP500. As of 29 September 2016, it has been decommissioned and powered down permanently. Cielo was succeeded by Trinity.
