= Sibel Edmonds =

American whistleblower (born 1970)

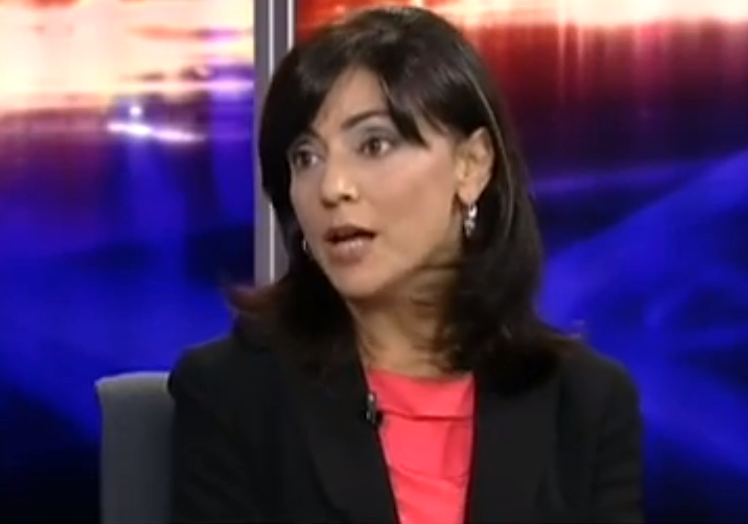
- Edmonds in 2012
- Born: 1970 (age 55–56)
- Known for: Whistleblower

Sibel Edmonds is a former contract translator for the Federal Bureau of Investigation (FBI) and the founder and editor-in-chief of the independent news website NewsBud.

The FBI hired her as a translator shortly after 9/11 but fired her after less than seven months. She identified herself as a whistleblower and challenged her termination; however, the courts dismissed her lawsuit for wrongful termination because the FBI would need to disclose privileged information. She accused a colleague of covering up illicit activity involving Turkish nationals, alleged serious security breaches and cover-ups and that intelligence had been deliberately suppressed, endangering national security. Following her accusations, the US attorney -general imposed a state secrets privilege order on her, which prevents her from revealing more information about the FBI. The PEN American Center awarded her the PEN/Newman's Own First Amendment Award in 2006. She published a memoir in March 2012, titled Classified Woman – The Sibel Edmonds Story.

In 2004, Sibel Edmonds founded and published the Boiling Frogs Post, an online media site that states it offers nonpartisan investigative journalism. In 2016, as editor-in-chief, Sibel expanded and founded NewsBud independent news media outlet, with associates and partnered with BFP.

== Early life, family and education ==
The daughter of an Iranian Azerbaijani father and Turkish mother, Edmonds lived in Iran and then Turkey before coming to the United States as a student in 1988. Fluent in Azerbaijani, Turkish, Persian and English, Edmonds earned her bachelor's degree in criminal justice and psychology from George Washington University and her master's in public policy and international commerce from George Mason University.

In 1992, at age 22, she married Matthew Edmonds, a retail-technology consultant from Virginia.

== FBI employment ==
Edmonds worked for the FBI for six months from late September 2001 until March 2002. Edmonds was hired, as a contractor, to work as an interpreter in the translations unit of the FBI in Washington on September 13, September 15, or September 20, 2001. Among her main roles was to translate covertly recorded conversations by Turkish diplomatic and political targets.

Edmonds filed complaints with the FBI's Office of Professional Responsibility and the United States Department of Justice Office of the Inspector General. In response, she said that managers retaliated against her, and she was fired on March 22, 2002. In June 2002, the Associated Press and Washington Post wrote that the FBI said Edmonds was dismissed because her actions were disruptive and breached security and that she performed poorly at her job. A 2005 internal investigation by the FBI Office of the Inspector General found that many of Edmonds's allegations of misconduct "had some basis in fact" and that "her allegations were at least a contributing factor in the FBI's decision to terminate her services," but were unable to substantiate all of her allegations, nor did they make a statement regarding her dismissal being improper.

Edmonds's allegations of impropriety at the FBI later came to the attention of the Senate Judiciary Committee, which held unclassified hearings on the matter on June 17, 2002, and July 9, 2002. During the hearings, the FBI provided various unclassified documents and statements relating to the case, which led to Senators Patrick Leahy and Chuck Grassley sending letters, dated June 19, 2002, August 13, 2002, and October 28, 2002, to Inspector General Glenn A. Fine, Attorney General Ashcroft, and FBI Director Robert Mueller, respectively, asking for explanations and calling for an independent audit of the FBI's translation unit. These documents were published on the Senators' web sites.

== Post-FBI ==
In April 2004, Edmonds stated she had provided information to the panel investigating the September 11 attacks in February of that year. Although she started work shortly after 9/11 and worked for just over six months, she said knowledge of information circulating within the FBI during the spring and summer of 2001. The session was closed and over three hours long, she said. Reportedly, she told the commission that the FBI knew of a planned attack months away and the terrorists were in place. She stated, "There was general information about the time-frame, about methods to be used, but not specifically about how they would be used and about people being in place and who was ordering these sorts of terror attacks. There were other cities that were mentioned. Major cities with skyscrapers." On the 26th, a deposition of Edmonds was quashed under the state secrets privilege.

On May 13, 2004, Ashcroft submitted statements to justify the use of the state secrets privilege against the planned deposition by Edmonds, and the same day, the FBI retroactively classified as Top Secret all of the material and statements that had been provided to the Senate Judiciary Committee in 2002 relating to Edmonds's own lawsuit, as well as the letters that had been sent by the Senators and republished by the Project on Government Oversight.

On June 23, 2004, the retroactive reclassification was challenged in a suit filed by the Project on Government Oversight, citing fear that the group might be retroactively punished for having published the letters on its website. The Justice Department tried to get the suit dismissed, and the Justice Department explicitly approved their release to the Project on Government Oversight. The reclassification did, however, keep Edmonds from testifying in the class action suit as well as her own whistleblower suit. The latter decision was appealed, and Inspector General Glenn A. Fine released a summary of the audit report, stating "that many of her allegations were supported, that the FBI did not take them seriously enough, and that her allegations were, in fact, the most significant factor in the FBI's decision to terminate her services. Rather than investigate Edmonds's allegations vigorously and thoroughly, the FBI concluded that she was a disruption and terminated her contract."

In August 2004, Edmonds founded the National Security Whistleblowers Coalition (NSWBC), which exists to assist national security whistleblowers through advocacy and reform.

In September 2005, Edmonds said in Vanity Fair that a price was set for Dennis Hastert to withdraw support for the Armenian genocide resolution. That the "... Turkish Consulate ... claimed in one recording that the price for Hastert to withdraw the resolution would have been at least $500,000."

In September 2006, a documentary about Edmonds's case called Kill the Messenger (Une Femme à Abattre) premiered in France. The film discusses the Edmonds case and offers interviews with various involved individuals.

Edmonds gave testimony in August 2009 and gave information that had twice previously been gagged under state secrets privilege.

On February 1, 2011, Edmonds published a story on her own website, adding details of events she described as taking place in April 2001. The account is of another translator's description of meetings with an Iranian informant months before 9/11, and FBI agents' reaction to it:

Bin Laden's group is planning a massive terrorist attack in the United States. The order has been issued. They are targeting major cities, big metropolitan cities; they think four or five cities; New York City, Chicago, Washington DC, and San Francisco; possibly Los Angeles or Las Vegas. They will use airplanes to carry out the attacks. They said that some of the individuals involved in carrying this out are already in the United States. They are here in the U.S., living among us, and I believe some in US government already know about all of this.

Edmonds said that two agents with whom this other translator had worked reported this information to a "Special Agent in Charge (SAC)" months before the attack. After the attack, one of them told their translator that the SAC "called us into his office and gave us an order; an absolute order [that] we never got any warnings. Those conversations never existed; it never happened; period. He said this is very sensitive…and that no one should ever mention a word about this case; period.'"

== Classified Woman ==
In 2012, she published an autobiography called Classified Woman – The Sibel Edmonds Story: A Memoir. Reviewing the book for The American Conservative, Philip Giraldi said that some details of the book could be challenged due to passage of time. However, he felt the central thesis of government incompetence and corruption was correct.

== NewsBud ==
Sibel Edmonds, along with others, formed NewsBud, supported by Kickstarter donations. Sibel Edmonds's primarily solo Boiling Frogs Post featuring articles and videos is being merged and absorbed into NewsBud – so BFP content is becoming NewsBud content and NewsBud content occasionally appears as a BFP heading or website.

== Bibliography ==
- Sibel D. Edmonds: Classified Woman – The Sibel Edmonds Story: A Memoir. (2012) ISBN 0-615-60222-3
- Sibel D. Edmonds: The Lone Gladio (Volume 1) (2014) ISBN 0-692-21329-5

== See also ==
- The 28 pages
- Able Danger
- Anthony Shaffer
- Operation Cyclone
- Transparency International
- Ptech
- David Kelly
- Downing Street memo
- Stanley Hilton
- American Turkish Council
- Brewster Jennings & Associates
- List of Iranian women journalists
