= Daniel M. Hirsch =

American diplomat (born 1959)

Daniel M. Hirsch (born 1959 in Washington DC) is retired Senior Foreign Service Officer, currently a manager of the Non-Proliferation and Disarmament Fund of the U.S. Department of State. From July 2009 to July 2013 he served as State Vice President of the American Foreign Service Association(). In that role, he was the primary labor-management negotiator representing roughly 12,000 State Department members of the American Foreign Service and was the senior vice president of the professional association representing the entire American Foreign Service.

Born into a Foreign Service family, Hirsch has been associated with the Foreign Service for over 50 years, spending his childhood in Asia, Africa and Washington DC, and studying at the University of Maryland, College Park, before entering the Service himself in 1985. He served in 11 overseas postings, including Mali, Cape Verde, Mozambique, Guinea Bissau, Uzbekistan, Nigeria, India, Kyrgyzstan, Serbia, Turkmenistan and Tunisia, where he helped open, close and move embassies and established new employee associations, schools and medical clinics. He also served as a reporting officer at the United States Mission to the United Nations (USUN), as the Senior Regional Management Advisor to the State Department's Bureaus of Near Eastern and South and Central Asian Affairs, as a senior advisor to the executive director of the State Department's Bureaus of Educational and Cultural Affairs and International Informational Programs, as a special advisor to the Director of Overseas Employment of the State Department's Bureau of Human Resources, and as Director of the Department's Overseas Motor Vehicle Program, overseeing the entire overseas motor vehicle fleet of the Department of State. He has received over a dozen individual awards for performance, including the State Department's Meritorious and Superior Honor Awards and a 2002 Department-wide award for excellence in logistics management. At three overseas posts, he served as Post Security Officer, and at eleven he served on the Emergency Action Committee.

Active in AFSA since 1985, he has served as an AFSA post representative, as a member of AFSA's State Standing Committee and as a contributor to the Foreign Service Journal. As a member of the Department of State's mentoring program, he mentored eight current Foreign Service Officers.
