= Whistleblower Protection Act =

US law regarding protection of federal whistleblowers

- Long title: An Act to amend title 5, United States Code, to strengthen the protections available to Federal employees against prohibited personnel practices, and for other purposes.
- Nicknames: Whistleblower Protection Act of 1989
- Enacted by: the 101st United States Congress
- Effective: April 10, 1989

Citations
- Public law: 101-12
- Statutes at Large: 103 Stat. 16

Codification
- Titles amended: 5 U.S.C.: Government Organization and Employees
- U.S.C. sections amended: 5 U.S.C. ch. 12 § 1201 et seq.

Legislative history
- Introduced in the Senate as S. 20 by Carl Levin (D–MI) on January 25, 1989; Passed the Senate on March 16, 1989 (97-0, Roll call vote 24, via Senate.gov); Passed the House on March 21, 1989 (Agreed voice vote); Signed into law by President George H. W. Bush on April 10, 1989

The Whistleblower Protection Act of 1989, 5 U.S.C. 2302(b)(8)-(9), Pub.L. 101-12 as amended, is a United States federal law that protects federal whistleblowers who work for the government and report the possible existence of an activity constituting a violation of law, rules, or regulations, or mismanagement, gross waste of funds, abuse of authority or a substantial and specific danger to public health and safety. A federal agency violates the Whistleblower Protection Act if agency authorities take (or threaten to take) retaliatory personnel action against any employee or applicant because of disclosure of information by that employee or applicant.

== Authorized federal agencies ==
- The Office of Special Counsel investigates federal whistleblower complaints. In October 2008, then-special counsel Scott Bloch resigned amid an FBI investigation into whether he obstructed justice by illegally deleting computer files following complaints that he had retaliated against employees who disagreed with his policies. Then-Senator Barack Obama made a campaign vow to appoint a special counsel committed to whistleblower rights. It was not until April 2011 that President Obama's appointee Carolyn Lerner was confirmed by the Senate. Today, the primary mission of OSC is to safeguard the merit system by protecting federal employees and applicants from prohibited personnel practices, especially reprisal for whistleblowing.
- The Merit Systems Protection Board, a quasi-judicial agency that adjudicates whistleblower complaints, uses appointed administrative law judges who often back the government. Since 2000, the board has ruled for whistleblowers just three times in 56 cases decided on their merits, according to a Government Accountability Project (GAP) analysis. Obama appointed a new chairperson and vice chairperson with backgrounds as federal worker advocates, but Tom Devine of the GAP argued that it would be "likely to take years for them to turn things around." Currently, this office works to protect the Merit System Principles and promote an effective Federal workforce free of Prohibited Personnel Practices.
- The Court of Appeals for the Federal Circuit was established under Article III of the Constitution on October 1, 1982. It is the only court empowered to hear appeals of whistleblower cases decided by the merit board. The Federal Circuit has been criticized by Senator Grassley (R-Iowa) and others in Congress for misinterpreting whistleblower laws and setting a precedent that is hostile to claimants. Between 1994 and 2010, the court had ruled for whistleblowers in only three of 203 cases decided on their merits, GAP's analysis found.

== Legal cases ==
The US Supreme Court, in the 2006 case of Garcetti v. Ceballos, ruled that government employees do not have protection from retaliation by their employers under the First Amendment of the Constitution when they speak pursuant to their official job duties. The U.S. Merit Systems Protection Board (MSPB) uses agency lawyers in the place of administrative law judges to decide federal employees' whistleblower appeals. These lawyers, dubbed "attorney examiners," deny 98% of whistleblower appeals; the Board and the Federal Circuit Court of Appeals give great deference to their initial decisions, resulting in affirmance rates of 97% and 98%, respectively. The most common characteristics for a court claim that are encompassed within the protection of the Act include: that the plaintiff is an employee or person covered under the specific statutory or common law relied upon for action, that the defendant is an employer or person covered under the specific statutory or common law relied upon for the action, that the plaintiff engaged in protected whistleblower activity, that the defendant knew or had knowledge that the plaintiff engaged in such activity, that there was retaliatory action taken against the one doing the whistleblowing and that the unfair treatment would not have occurred if the plaintiff had not brought to attention the activities.

Robert MacLean of the Federal Air Marshal Service blew the whistle on the fact that the TSA had cut its funding for hiring additional air marshals. In 2009, the Government Accountability Project challenged MacLean's dismissal to the Merit Systems Protection Board on the grounds that "his disclosure of the text message was protected under the Whistleblower Protection Act of 1989, because he 'reasonably believe[d]' that the leaked information disclosed 'a substantial and specific danger to public health or safety'." In Department of Homeland Security v. MacLean (2015), the Supreme Court ruled in his favor.

== Related legislation ==
President Barack Obama issued Presidential Policy Directive 19 (PPD-19), entitled "Protecting Whistleblowers with Access to Classified Information". According to the directive signed by Obama on October 10, 2012, it is written that "this Presidential Policy Directive ensures that employees serving in the Intelligence Community or who are eligible for access to classified information can effectively report waste, fraud, and abuse while protecting classified national security information. It prohibits retaliation against employees for reporting waste, fraud, and abuse.

However, according to a report that the Committee on Homeland Security and Governmental Affairs submitted to accompany S. 743, "the federal whistleblowers have seen their protections diminish in recent years, largely as a result of a series of decisions by the United States Court of Appeals for the Federal Circuit, which has exclusive jurisdiction over many cases brought under the Whistleblower Protection Act (WPA). Specifically, the Federal Circuit has accorded a narrow definition to the type of disclosure that qualifies for whistleblower protection. Additionally, the lack of remedies under current law for most whistleblowers in the intelligence community and for whistleblowers who face retaliation in the form of withdrawal of the employee's security clearance leaves unprotected those who are in a position to disclose wrongdoing that directly affects our national security." S. 743 would address these problems by restoring the original congressional intent of the WPA to adequately protect whistleblowers, by strengthening the WPA, and by creating new whistleblower protections for intelligence employees and new protections for employees whose security clearance is withdrawn in retaliation for having made legitimate whistleblower disclosures.

Passed in September 2014, the All Circuit Review Extension Act authorized federal employees to appeal their judgements from the Merit Systems Protection Board and Office of Personnel Management to whichever Court of Appeals has jurisdiction.

== See also ==
- Whistleblower protection in United States
- False Claims Act
- Federal crime
- Immunity from prosecution
- Informant
- List of whistleblowers
- Military Whistleblower Protection Act
- Qui tam
- Testimony
- Turn state's evidence
- White collar crime
- Witness
- Witness intimidation
- United States Federal Witness Protection Program
- United States Marshals Service
