= Harlow v. Fitzgerald =

- Supreme Court of the United States

Argued November 30, 1981 Decided June 24, 1982
- Full case name: Bryce Harlow, et al. v. A. Ernest Fitzgerald
- Citations: 457 U.S. 800 (more) 102 S. Ct. 2727; 73 L. Ed. 2d 396; 1982 U.S. LEXIS 139

Case history
- Prior: Cert. to the United States Court of Appeals for the District of Columbia Circuit

Holding
- Presidential aides were not entitled to absolute immunity, but instead deserved qualified immunity.

Court membership
- Chief Justice Warren E. Burger Associate Justices William J. Brennan Jr. · Byron White; Thurgood Marshall · Harry Blackmun; Lewis F. Powell Jr. · William Rehnquist; John P. Stevens · Sandra Day O'Connor

Case opinions
- Majority: Powell, joined by Brennan, White, Marshall, Blackmun, Rehnquist, Stevens, O'Connor
- Concurrence: Brennan, joined by Marshall, Blackmun
- Concurrence: Brennan, White, Marshall, Blackmun
- Concurrence: Rehnquist
- Dissent: Burger

Harlow v. Fitzgerald, 457 U.S. 800 (1982), was a case decided by the United States Supreme Court involving the doctrines of qualified immunity and absolute immunity.

== Background ==
Arthur Ernest Fitzgerald was a deputy for management systems in the Office of the Secretary of the Air Force. He discovered $2 billion in cost overruns and technical problems in the Lockheed C5-A program that had been concealed by the officials at the Pentagon. He testified before the Joint Economic Committee in Congress and was then blacklisted from roles of any significance.

Following the release of the Watergate tapes, Fitzgerald was mentioned by President Richard Nixon, who boasted that he had been responsible for firing Fitzgerald.

Fitzgerald filed a lawsuit against government officials claiming that he lost his position as a contractor with the US Air Force because of his whistleblower testimony made before Congress in 1969. Absolute immunity was claimed by the officials involved, including Nixon and several of his aides, which generated several additional cases that made their way to the Supreme Court. Nixon was named in the lawsuit but was found to have absolute immunity in his role as president, as decided in Nixon v. Fitzgerald.

Harlow v. Fitzgerald examined whether that degree of immunity extended to the President's aides.

== Opinion ==
In an 8–1 decision, the Court held that government officials other than the President were generally entitled to qualified immunity. An official can obtain absolute immunity but must "first show that the responsibilities of his office embraced a function so sensitive as to require a total shield from liability. He must then demonstrate that he was discharging the protected function when performing the act for which liability is asserted."

Despite its immediate application to White House aides, the case is regarded as most important for its revision of the qualified immunity standard that is applicable to government actors, more generally. The Court held that "government officials performing discretionary functions, generally are shielded from liability for civil damages insofar as their conduct does not violate clearly established statutory or constitutional rights of which a reasonable person would have known."
