= Qualified immunity =

Legal doctrine in United States law

Qualified immunity is a legal doctrine in United States law that grants government officials—in the performance of their duties—immunity from lawsuits unless the plaintiff shows that the official violated civil or constitutional rights, or acted outside of their scope of authority.

It is comparable to sovereign immunity, though it protects government employees rather than the government itself. It is less strict than absolute immunity, by protecting officials who "make reasonable but mistaken judgments about open legal questions", extending to "all [officials] but the plainly incompetent or those who knowingly violate the law". Qualified immunity applies only to government officials in civil litigation, and does not protect the government itself from suits arising from officials' actions.

The U.S. Supreme Court first introduced the qualified immunity doctrine in Pierson v. Ray (1967), a case litigated during the height of the civil rights movement. It is stated to have been originally introduced with the rationale of protecting law enforcement officials from frivolous lawsuits and financial liability in cases where they acted in good faith in unclear legal situations. Starting around 2005, courts increasingly applied the doctrine to cases involving the use of excessive or deadly force by police, leading to widespread criticism that it "has become a nearly failsafe tool to let police brutality go unpunished and deny victims their constitutional rights", as summarized in a 2020 Reuters report.

== History and background ==
=== Pierson v. Ray ===
In Pierson v. Ray (1967), the Supreme Court first "justified qualified immunity as a means of protecting government defendants from financial burdens when acting in good faith in legally murky areas. Qualified immunity was necessary, according to the Court, because '[a] policeman's lot is not so unhappy that he must choose between being charged with dereliction of duty if he does not arrest when he had probable cause, and being mulcted in damages if he does.'"

=== Bivens and 42 USC § 1983 lawsuits ===
Qualified immunity frequently arises in civil rights cases, particularly in lawsuits arising under 42 USC § 1983 and Bivens v. Six Unknown Named Agents (1971). Under 42 USC § 1983, a plaintiff can sue for damages when state officials violate their constitutional rights or other federal rights. The text of 42 USC § 1983 reads as follows:

Every person who, under color of any statute, ordinance, regulation, custom, or usage, of any State or Territory or the District of Columbia, subjects, or causes to be subjected, any citizen of the United States or other person within the jurisdiction thereof to the deprivation of any rights, privileges, or immunities secured by the Constitution and laws, shall be liable to the party injured ...

Similarly, under Bivens v. Six Unknown Named Agents, plaintiffs may sue for damages if federal officials violate their constitutional rights. However, not all Constitutional violations give rise to a Bivens cause of action. Thus far the Supreme Court has recognized Bivens claims for violations of the Fourth Amendment, the Fifth Amendment's equal protection component of due process, and the Eighth Amendment, but as of 2022, the Supreme Court has severely restricted the availability of Bivens claims.

=== Harlow v. Fitzgerald ===
The modern test for qualified immunity was established in Harlow v. Fitzgerald (1982).

Prior to Harlow v. Fitzgerald, the U.S. Supreme Court granted immunity to government officials only if: (1) the official believed in good faith that their conduct was lawful, and (2) the conduct was objectively reasonable. However, determining an official's subjective state of mind (i.e. did they have a good faith belief that their action was lawful) required a trial, often by jury. Concerns over allowing suits to go this far deterred officials from performing their duties, "[diverted] official energy from pressing public issues, and [deterred] able citizens from acceptance of public office", the Supreme Court handed down the current rule for qualified immunity: "[G]overnment officials performing discretionary functions generally are shielded from liability for civil damages insofar as their conduct does not violate clearly established statutory or constitutional rights of which a reasonable person would have known." Therefore, the application of qualified immunity no longer depends upon an official's subjective state of mind, but on whether or not a reasonable person in the official's position would have known their actions were in line with clearly established legal principles.

=== Saucier v. Katz ===
In Saucier v. Katz (2001), military officers Saucier and Parker were warned of possible protests during a speech from Vice President Albert Gore, Jr. When Katz began putting up a banner in defense of animal rights, Saucier detained Katz in his military van. Katz sued because he felt his Fourth Amendment rights had been violated. The court ultimately ruled in favor of Saucier, due to qualified immunity. The Supreme Court held that "the ruling on qualified immunity requires an analysis not susceptible of fusion with the question whether unreasonable force was used in making the arrest". In other words, the analysis applied to claims of excessive force is not the same as the analysis applied to the merits of the claim. The Court's decision in this case provides a two-step inquiry into claims brought against a government official: first, whether the official's actions violated the constitutional rights of the plaintiff, and second, whether those rights were clearly established at the time of the incident.

=== Pearson v. Callahan ===
The Supreme Court's 2009 decision in Pearson et al. v. Callahan overturned its decision in Saucier v. Katz and the two-step inquiry giving more discretion to the lower courts. The inquiry into the law or into the Constitution in relation to similar cases brought before the courts was up to the courts to decide.

== Application of qualified immunity ==
=== Discretionary function requirement ===
Qualified immunity only applies to acts that are "discretionary" rather than ministerial. Courts specifically distinguish discretionary acts from ministerial acts. A discretionary act requires an official to determine "whether an act should be done or a course pursued" and to determine the best means of achieving the chosen objective. By contrast, a ministerial act is of a "clerical nature" – the official is typically required to perform the action regardless of their own opinion. Even ministerial tasks will sometimes involve a small amount of discretion, but this discretion will not necessarily satisfy the requirements of qualified immunity. Conversely, the discretionary function requirement also restricts the availability of qualified immunity to actions taken "within the scope of an official's duties." Thus, if a government official acts beyond the bounds of his authority, he is not protected by qualified immunity.

=== Clearly established law requirement ===
Qualified immunity does not protect officials who violate "clearly established statutory or constitutional rights of which reasonable person would have known". This is an objective standard, meaning that the standard does not depend on the subjective state of mind of the official but rather on whether a reasonable person would determine that the relevant conduct violated clearly established law.

Whether the law is "clearly established" depends on whether the case law has addressed the disputed issue or has established the "contours of the right" such that it is clear that the official's conduct is illegal. It is undisputed that Supreme Court opinions can "clearly establish" the rule for the entire country. However, circuit court of appeals opinions may have a more limited effect. Circuit courts of appeals typically treat their opinions as clearly establishing the law within that circuit—though the Supreme Court has cast doubt on this theory. In order to meet the requirement of clearly established law, the facts of the instant case must also fairly closely resemble the facts of the case relied on as precedent.

=== Qualified immunity sequencing ===
The concept of testing whether the official action was covered by qualified immunity was first raised in the 1991 case Siegert v. Gilley (1991) in which the Supreme Court affirmed a dismissal of a lawsuit due to lack of clear demonstration that a constitutional right had been violated at the time of the action as a necessary precursor for any judicial relief.

In 2001, the U.S. Supreme Court in Saucier v. Katz formalized this rigid order, or sequencing, in which courts must decide the merits of a defendant's qualified immunity defense. First, the court determines whether the complaint states a constitutional violation. If so, the next sequential step is to determine whether the right at issue was clearly established at the time of the official's conduct. The Court subsequently modified this mandatory sequencing from Saucier in Pearson v. Callahan in 2009, holding that "the Saucier protocol should not be regarded as mandatory in all cases," and that its decision "does not prevent the lower courts from following the Saucier procedure; it simply recognizes that those courts should have the discretion to decide whether that procedure is worthwhile in particular cases." The Pearson opinion gave courts the discretion to evaluate either the constitutional violation or the rights issue first. This can have benefits of expediting some cases and reducing waste of resources in the court system, but has also led to cases that focus heavily on one side of the case and weigh in favor of government officials, particularly in the area of police brutality.

== Objections and criticisms ==
=== Difficulty of suing public officials ===
Critics have argued that qualified immunity makes it excessively difficult to sue public officials for misconduct. Criticism is aimed in particular at the "clearly established law" test. This test is typically read as requiring not only that an official's behavior likely violates written law but that there exists a clear judicial precedent that establishes the behavior as unlawful. Critics have noted that in practice this has meant that plaintiffs must prove that there exists a prior court determination made in actual litigation under facts extremely close to those of the case at hand, or else the case is dismissed. Critics argue that the difficulty plaintiffs face in finding an exact match in both law and precedent makes it excessively challenging to sue public officials, giving government officials undue latitude for lawless conduct in new or unusual situations. George Leef, for instance, argued in Forbes that:

This doctrine, invented by the Court out of whole cloth, immunizes public officials even when they commit legal misconduct unless they violated 'clearly established law'. That standard is incredibly difficult for civil rights plaintiffs to overcome because the courts have required not just a clear legal rule, but a prior case on the books with functionally identical facts.

Critics have cited examples such as a November 2018 ruling by the United States Court of Appeals for the Sixth Circuit, which found that an earlier court case ruling it unconstitutional for police to sic dogs on suspects who have surrendered by lying on the ground did not apply under the "clearly established" rule to a case in which Tennessee police allowed their police dog to bite a surrendered suspect because the suspect had surrendered not by lying down but by sitting on the ground and raising his hands.

Critics further argue that the "clearly established" standard discourages or delays the establishment of clear rules, even for common circumstances. The first litigant to bring a case against an official under a given set of facts is likely to lose because there is as yet no clearly established standard. Therefore, such a person may choose not to bring the case at all. Furthermore, even if a case is brought and carried to judgment, there is no certainty the decision will establish a clear and generally applicable legal standard. Until such a standard is articulated, qualified immunity will continue to apply in analogous cases. As the Institute for Justice puts it, "Qualified immunity means that government officials can get away with violating your rights as long as they violate them in a way nobody thought of before." Similarly, federal judge Carlton W. Reeves wrote in a case denying qualified immunity, "A cynic might say that with qualified immunity, government agents are at liberty to violate your constitutional rights as long as they do so in a novel way", and called for change.

=== Police brutality ===
A significant amount of criticism contends that qualified immunity allows police brutality to go unpunished. Legal researchers Amir H. Ali and Emily Clark, for instance, have argued that "qualified immunity permits law enforcement and other government officials to violate people's constitutional rights with virtual impunity". Supreme Court Justice Sonia Sotomayor has noted a "disturbing trend" of siding with police officers using excessive force with qualified immunity, describing it as "sanctioning a 'shoot first, think later' approach to policing". She stated:

We have not hesitated to summarily reverse courts for wrongly denying officers the protection of qualified immunity in cases involving the use of force ... But we rarely intervene where courts wrongly afford officers the benefit of qualified immunity in these same cases.

A 2020 Reuters report concurred with Sotomayor, concluding that "the Supreme Court has built qualified immunity into an often insurmountable police defense by intervening in cases mostly to favor the police". The report reviewed over 200 cases involving excess force by police since 2007, and found since the 2009 Pearson change from mandatory sequencing to discretionary sequencing, plaintiffs have had a more difficult time moving their case past the qualified immunity stage.

=== Judicial activism ===
No federal statute explicitly grants qualified immunity—it is a judicial precedent established by the Supreme Court. While qualified immunity has been repeatedly affirmed by courts and legislation has established similar immunity at the state level, critics have argued that the adoption of qualified immunity in federal law amounts to judicial activism, as the legal doctrine has little basis in written law. The late Supreme Court Justice Antonin Scalia argued as much in his dissent in Crawford-El v. Britton: "[the Supreme Court] find[s] [itself] engaged ... in the essentially legislative activity of crafting a sensible scheme of qualified immunities for the statute we have invented—rather than applying the common law embodied in the statute that Congress wrote". Clarence Thomas has likewise expressed "growing concern with our qualified immunity jurisprudence", stating that there is no apparent basis for it in the original intent of the law; in Ziglar v. Abbasi, Thomas urged the court to reconsider qualified immunity, which he considered a doctrine that "substitute[s] our own policy preferences for the mandates of Congress". In a case denying qualified immunity and ruling it unconstitutional, federal judge Carlton W. Reeves wrote, "Congress's intent to protect citizens from government abuse cannot be overridden by judges who think they know better."

Some critics have argued that the Supreme Court's creation of qualified immunity amounts to "gutting" Section 1983 of the United States Code, which allows any citizen to sue a public official who deprives them "of any rights, privileges, or immunities secured by the Constitution and laws". U.S. District Court Judge Lynn Adelman has argued that "qualified immunity is a limitation on Section 1983 that the Court created in 1982 without support in the statute's text or legislative history". University of Pennsylvania professor of law David Rudovsky similarly argued that "the Court ... has engaged in an aggressive reconstruction of the scope of § 1983 ... This reorientation of civil rights jurisprudence has blunted the impact of § 1983".

=== Scholarly critiques ===
In a 2017 Yale Law Journal paper titled "How Qualified Immunity Fails", UCLA law professor Joanna C. Schwartz examined 1,183 Section 1983 cases and found that it was being invoked primarily when it should not have been, and therefore was being ignored or dismissed frequently. Her conclusion was that it is ineffective for its stated goals in such a way that it could not be strengthened, and should be replaced by other mechanisms for obtaining those ends.

The Court has stated that it bases qualified immunity on three factors: a "good faith" defense at common law, making up for the supposedly mistaken broadening of § 1983, and serving as a "warning" to government officials. In a 2018 California Law Review article, University of Chicago Law School professor William Baude states that "there is no such defense, there was no such mistake, and lenity [warning] should not apply. And even if these things were otherwise, the doctrine of qualified immunity would not be the best response."

In a 2023 California Law Review article, Cardozo School of Law professor Alexander Reinert critiqued qualified immunity in the context of Supreme Court derogation canon, and also suggested that the legal foundation of qualified immunity is based on the erroneous omission of language in the 1874 Revised Statutes of the United States. Reinert observed that the Enforcement Act of 1871 included a clause regarding liability with the text, "any such law, statute, ordinance, regulation, custom, or usage of the State to the contrary notwithstanding", which was not included in the Revised Statutes or 42 U.S.C. § 1983. Reinert termed this language the "Notwithstanding Clause". His analysis received press coverage and has been subsequently critiqued by William Baude, who stated, "it was a change introduced by the drafters of the 1874 Revised Statutes, and passed into law by Congress" (emphasis original). Baude acknowledged that there are thoughtful responses to this critique. Questions regarding the impact of the Notwithstanding Clause on qualified immunity doctrine were presented to the U.S. Supreme Court in a petition for a writ of certiorari in the case of Hulbert v. Pope, which was denied.

== Challenges to qualified immunity ==
=== Through litigation ===
Numerous public interest organizations litigate in the courts of law to restrict or eliminate qualified immunity. Among them are the Institute for Justice, Second Amendment Foundation, Alliance Defending Freedom, NAACP Legal Defense Fund, the MacArthur Justice Center, the ACLU, Rights Behind Bars, and the Institute for Constitutional Advocacy and Protection. These organizations work is often supported by amici from other public interest organizations including the Cato Institute, Law Enforcement Action Partnership and Restore the Fourth.

In August 2018, Circuit Judge Don Willett concurred dubitante when the United States Court of Appeals for the Fifth Circuit found that the Texas Medical Board was entitled to qualified immunity for an unconstitutional warrantless search it made of a doctor's patient records. Willett called for "thoughtful reappraisal" of the "'clearly established law' prong of qualified-immunity analysis", citing a tendency for many courts to grant immunity based on no clear precedent, while avoiding the question of whether a Constitutional violation has occurred. Hence, those courts do not establish new law, so "[w]rongs are not righted, and wrongdoers are not reproached." He wrote:

To some observers, qualified immunity smacks of unqualified impunity, letting public officials duck consequences for bad behavior—no matter how palpably unreasonable—as long as they were the first to behave badly. Merely proving a constitutional deprivation doesn't cut it; plaintiffs must cite functionally identical precedent that places the legal question "beyond debate" to "every" reasonable officer. Put differently, it's immaterial that someone acts unconstitutionally if no prior case held such misconduct unlawful. This current "yes harm, no foul" imbalance leaves victims violated but not vindicated.

[...]

Section 1983 meets Catch-22. Important constitutional questions go unanswered precisely because those questions are yet unanswered. Courts then rely on that judicial silence to conclude there's no equivalent case on the books. No precedent = no clearly established law = no liability. An Escherian Stairwell. Heads government wins, tails plaintiff loses.

In 2020, there were several cases awaiting a Supreme Court decision involving qualified immunity. However, on June 15, 2020, the Supreme Court declined to hear cases involving revisiting qualified immunity. This was until November 2, 2020, when the Supreme Court ruled in a 7–1 per curiam decision that the 5th Circuit erred in granting two prison guards qualified immunity despite severe abuses. Erwin Chemerinsky of the UC Berkeley School of Law calls this "a rare civil rights victory on qualified immunity".

=== Legislative attempts ===
On May 30, 2020, U.S. Representative Justin Amash (L-Michigan) proposed the Ending Qualified Immunity Act, stating: "The brutal killing of George Floyd by Minneapolis police is merely the latest in a long line of incidents of egregious police misconduct ... police are legally, politically, and culturally insulated from consequences for violating the rights of the people whom they have sworn to serve". Representative Ayanna Pressley (D-Massachusetts) and 16 additional cosponsors introduced the bill in the House of Representatives on June 4, 2020, As of September 12, 2020, it had 66 cosponsors (65 Democrats and 1 Republican). A second bill aimed at ending qualified immunity for law enforcement, the Justice in Policing Act of 2020 (H.R.7120), was introduced by Rep. Karen Bass (D-California) on June 8, 2020. The bill's sponsorship by members of the Libertarian, Republican, and Democratic parties made it the first bill to have tripartisan support in Congress.

On June 3, 2020, Senators Kamala Harris (D-California), Edward Markey (D-Massachusetts), and Cory Booker (D-New Jersey) introduced a Senate resolution calling for the elimination of qualified immunity for law enforcement. Senators Bernie Sanders (I-Vermont), Elizabeth Warren (D-Massachusetts), and Chris Van Hollen (D-Maryland) were cosponsors. On June 23, 2020, Senator Mike Braun (R-Indiana) introduced the Reforming Qualified Immunity Act, proposing that "to claim qualified immunity under the Reforming Qualified Immunity Act, a government employee such as a police officer would have to prove that there was a statute or court case in the relevant jurisdiction showing his or her conduct was authorized".

=== State law ===
Qualified immunity is a doctrine of federal law, not affected by changes in state law. Nonetheless, some states have passed what they deem to be modifications of qualified immunity in the context of state law claims. These changes do not impact the doctrine of qualified immunity as applied to federal constitutional law. Colorado, Connecticut, New Mexico, and New York City have either ended qualified immunity altogether or limited its application in court cases involving state law claims.

Through the passing of the Enhance Law Enforcement Integrity Act in June 2020, Colorado became the first state to explicitly remove qualified immunity as a defense for law enforcement officers against state law claims (but not federal constitutional claims).

On April 7, 2021, Governor Michelle Lujan Grisham signed the New Mexico Civil Rights Act guaranteeing that no public official "shall enjoy the defense of qualified immunity for causing the deprivation of any rights, privileges or immunities secured by the constitution of" New Mexico. Again, this applies solely to state law claims, not federal constitutional claims.

The New York City Council eliminated qualified immunity for city officers in March 2021, as to state law claims but not as to federal claims.

== Relevant cases ==
- Harlow v. Fitzgerald, 457 U.S. 800 (1982)
- Wilson v. Layne, 526 U.S. 603 (1999)
- Saucier v. Katz, 533 U.S. 194 (2001)
- Hope v. Pelzer, 536 U.S. 730 (2002)
- Brosseau v. Haugen, 543 U.S. 194 (2004) (dealing with qualified immunity in highly fact-bound cases involving police use of force)
- Pearson v. Callahan, 555 U.S. 223 (2009)
- Safford Unified School District v. Redding, 557 U.S. 364 (2009) (dealing with qualified immunity in a case involving a search of a student by school officials)
- Camreta v. Greene, 563 U.S. 692 (2011)
- Plumhoff v. Rickard, 572 U.S. 765 (2014) (dealing with qualified immunity in highly fact-bound cases involving police use of force)
- Hernandez v. Mesa, 589 U.S. ____ (2020)
- Novak v. City of Parma, 21-3290 (2022)

== See also ==
- Absolute immunity
- Ignorantia juris non excusat
- Sovereign immunity
