= Legislative vacancy (United States) =

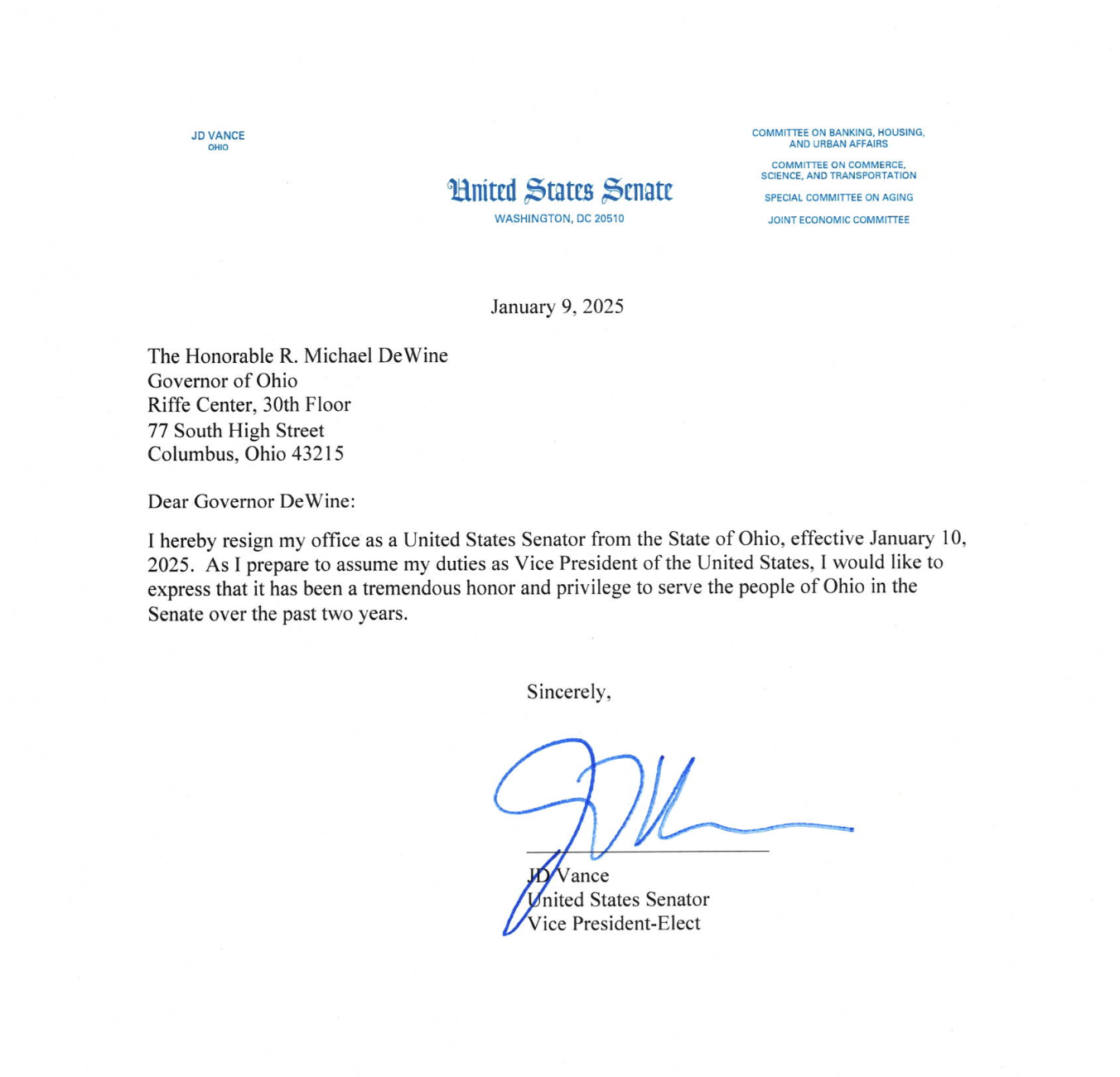
JD Vance resigned from the Senate upon being elected vice president, creating a legislative vacancy in the United States Senate

In the United States, a legislative vacancy occurs when a legislative office is unoccupied, typically caused by the death, resignation, removal of the prior officeholder, or a legislature's refusal to seat an elected official. This can occur in a federal, state, or local legislature.

A legislative vacancy may be filled by an executive official's (like a governor) appointment or a special election.

== Federal vacancies ==
Federally, a legislative vacancy may occur in the House of Representatives or the Senate, the two chambers of the United States Congress.

By law, the process for filling vacancies differs for each chamber, and is largely administered according to state law. Scholars attribute these differences to the Founding Fathers' views of the chambers' distanct roles.

Several academic studies have found the length of federal legislative vacancies to have increased in the 21st century.

=== House of Representatives ===
When a seat in the House of Representatives becomes vacant, the Constitution requires the state to which the seat belongs to hold an election to fill the vacancy. The specific timeline in which these elections occur, set by state law, varies widely. Temporary appointments are not allowed. This process typically begins by a state executive official issuing a writ of election or similar document.

In the wake of the September 11 attacks, Congress passed a law requiring states to hold special elections no later than 49 days after the Speaker of the House announces more than 100 vacancies in the chamber. This was part of an effort to ensure continuity of government. A 2024 Government Accountability Office report found that nine states had laws on the books facilitating these “extraordinary circumstances” special elections.

In the 21st century, the House averages 13 vacancies per congressional term.

=== Senate ===
Governor appoints a temporary senator with no restrictions Governor appoints a temporary senator with some restrictions Vacancy filled by special election, with no temporary senator appointed

Unlike the House, where special elections have always filled vacancies, the Senate's approach has changed through the history of the nation.

Originally, the Constitution empowered state legislatures to elect senators and fill vacancies, while the governor could make temporary appointments if the state legislature was not in session. Governors appointed 189 senators under this system. The Senate refused to seat 8 of those, arguing because the state legislature was in session at the time of their appointment, the governor had no authority to choose a temporary senator. However, this original method of filling senatorial vacancies (and electing senators generally) proved ineffective, with many seats experiencing prolonged vacancy because state lawmakers failed to agree on who to elect. This, among other issues, led to the ratification of the Seventeenth Amendment.

After ratification and today, senators are elected by their state's voting population, rather than by its legislature. The amendment preserved both governors' ability to make temporary appointments and the prominence of state law in filling vacancies.

As of July 2026, a majority of states (except for Kentucky, North Dakota, Rhode Island, and Wisconsin) allow their governors to make temporary appointments that hold office until an election can be held. In thirty-five states, these temporary senators remain in the Senate until the next regularly scheduled Senate election. In sixteen states, these temporary appointments remain in the Senate until a separate, expedited election is held independently of the normal election calendar. In four states, temporary senators must belong to the same political party as the prior incumbent to "respect the results of the previous election . . ." Since the ratification of the Seventeenth Amendment, 208 gubernatorial appointments have been made.

==== Challenges to temporary senatorial appointments ====
In the aftermath of Senator Robert F. Kennedy's assassination, his seat representing New York in the Senate became vacant. Because of the vacancy's proximity to the regularly scheduled election, and because of state law requiring senatorial special elections to take place in an even numbered year, the governor's temporary appointment served for 29 months (nearly two and a half years). Critics argued such a long delay before the special election violated their rights under Seventeenth Amendment to elect someone to fill the vacancy. In the case of Valenti v. Rockefeller, a federal district court disagreed, holding the Seventeenth Amendment granted the New York legislature wide discretion to determine the nature of senatorial special elections. In a later case, the United States Court of Appeals for the Third Circuit affirmed the Valenti holding, finding states are not required to hold a primary election prior to its senatorial special election. Beyond these cases, the Seventeenth Amendment's vacancy provision has rarely been interpreted by federal courts.

Following controversy in filling the vacancy left by Barack Obama upon his election to the presidency, twelve states saw legislation introduced that would have limited or eliminated a governor's appointment power, while three ultimately altered their governors' appointment power.

== State vacancies ==
A temporary appointment is made until the next regular election A special election is held to fill the vacancy A temporary appointment is made for remainder of the term Hybrid model

In the United States, each state has its own legislature, many with two chambers. Unlike on the federal level, how a state-level vacancy is filled is not mandated by the federal Constitution and varies widely from state-to-state. Nearly half of the states allow for temporary appointments, while slightly more than half require special elections. Of the states that allow for temporary appointments, a majority require the appointment to be of the same party as the preceding officeholder.

In Rodriguez v. Popular Democratic Party, the Supreme Court of the United States upheld the ability of state and territorial legislatures to determine the method by which state legislative vacancies are filled, including holding an election in which only the voters of the prior incumbent's party elect a new senator.

In recent years, some state lawmakers, like in Maryland, have argued temporary appointments are undemocratic and have made efforts to install a special election process. Others, like Maryland Senate President Bill Ferguson, argue the cost of special elections to fill vacancies is unnecessary. Some academics, like Tyler Yeargain, argue special elections may result in misrepresentation due to the historical low turnout of special elections, whereas same-party appointments maintain the interests of voters expressed in the prior election.

The process by which candidates for a special election are selected has been criticized as undemocratic. For instance, in Pennsylvania, candidates to fill vacancies in the state legislature are chosen by the county and state parties, a process that state Representative Chris Rabb considered opaque and lacking public transparency.

In September 2026, the West Virginia Democratic Party sued various Republican officials over the appointment of a Republican to a seat vacated by a registered Democrat. The state's Solicitor general argued the state Supreme Court did not have jurisdiction to settle the issue, and that the matter was for the legislature to handle.

A study by the Institute for Responsive Government found that, between 2020 and 2025, vacancies lasted for 23.7 days in states that fill vacancies through appointment, and 123.9 days in states that use special elections. On average, state legislative vacancies lasted 85.4 days. The study also found that most state lawmakers left office early to pursue other public office, due to illness or death, or to take a job outside the public sector.

== See also ==
- Executive vacancies
