= Youngberg v. Romeo =

- Supreme Court of the United States

Argued January 11, 1982 Decided June 18, 1982
- Full case name: Duane Youngberg, Superintendent, Pennhurst State School and Hospital, et al. v. Nicholas Romeo, an incompetent, by his mother and next friend, Romeo
- Citations: 457 U.S. 307 (more) 102 S. Ct. 2452; 73 L. Ed. 2d 28; 1982 U.S. LEXIS 128; 50 U.S.L.W. 4681
- Argument: Oral argument

Case history
- Prior: Certiorari to the United States Court of Appeals for the Third Circuit.

Holding
- Involuntarily committed residents have protected liberty interests under the Due Process Clause to reasonably safe conditions of confinement, freedom from unreasonable bodily restraints, and such minimally adequate training as reasonably may be required by these interests.

Court membership
- Chief Justice Warren E. Burger Associate Justices William J. Brennan Jr. · Byron White; Thurgood Marshall · Harry Blackmun; Lewis F. Powell Jr. · William Rehnquist; John P. Stevens · Sandra Day O'Connor

Case opinions
- Majority: Powell, joined by Brennan, White, Marshall, Blackmun, Rehnquist, Stevens, O'Connor
- Concurrence: Blackmun, joined by Brennan, O'Connor
- Concurrence: Burger (in the judgment)

Laws applied
- U.S. Const. amend. XIV

Youngberg v. Romeo, 457 U.S. 307 (1982), is a landmark United States Supreme Court case regarding the rights of the involuntarily committed and those with intellectual disabilities. Nicholas Romeo had an intellectual disability with an infant level IQ and was committed to a Pennsylvania state hospital. He was restrained for 9 months straight out of his 11 month stay and repeatedly abused. The Supreme Court agreed with the Third Circuit Court of Appeals that involuntarily committed residents had the right to reasonably safe confinement conditions, no unreasonable body restraints and the habilitation they reasonably require.

== Background ==
The defendants, who were management personnel at Pennhurst State School, an old state facility to which Romeo's mother had him committed when she could no longer care for him, did not dispute Romeo's right to care, habilitation, training and security. The critical issue in the case was the standard of care and whether the defendants had violated that standard, and therefore, Romeo's federally protected civil rights. The federal courts had not yet addressed this question in the context of intellectual disability. The trial court therefore looked to a then-recent Supreme Court decision holding that deliberate indifference to serious medical needs of prisoners constitutes "unnecessary and wanton infliction of pain" in violation of the 8th Amendment. The jury found for the defendants. The 3rd Circuit reversed and ordered a new trial, explaining that the standard of care should have been based on the 14th rather than the 8th Amendment and the Supreme Court agreed. However, the high court rejected the circuit court's articulation of the standard of care.

== Opinion of the Court ==
The syllabus summarizes the court's holding:

Respondent [Romeo] has constitutionally protected liberty interests under the Due Process Clause of the Fourteenth Amendment to reasonably safe conditions of confinement, freedom from unreasonable bodily restraints, and such minimally adequate training as reasonably may be required by these interests. Whether [his] constitutional rights have been violated must be determined by balancing these liberty interests against the relevant state interests. The proper standard for determining whether the State has adequately protected such rights is whether professional judgment, in fact, was exercised. And in determining what is 'reasonable,' courts must show deference to the judgment exercised by a qualified professional, whose decision is presumptively valid.

== Subsequent developments ==
Shortly after it was remanded to the trial court the case was settled in conjunction with a state decision to close Pennhurst in 1986, and close all other such institutions.

== See also ==
- Jarvis hearings
- List of United States Supreme Court cases, volume 457

== Bibliography ==
- Turnbull III, H. Rutherford (Fall 1982). "Youngberg v. Romeo: An Essay". Research and Practice for Persons with Severe Disabilities. 7 (3): 3–6. doi:10.1177/154079698200700301. S2CID 140420713.
- Woestendiek, John (May 27, 1984). "The Deinstitutionalization of Nicholas Romeo" (PDF). Philadelphia Inquirer Magazine. Philadelphia, Penn.: Philadelphia Media Network.
