= Anti-Gag Statute =

American legal statute regarding state secrets

The anti-gag statute is a legal boundary in the long struggle in the United States between Executive Branch secrecy and the United States Congress and the public's right to know. Since 1988, the statute has been an annual appropriations restriction drawing the line on Executive branch efforts to limit whistleblowing disclosures to information that is specifically identified in advance as classified. The anti-gag statute requires a mandatory, specifically worded addendum on any nondisclosure policy, form or agreement to legally spend money to implement or enforce the gag order.

The addendum states that the Whistleblower Protection Act of 1989 (protecting public disclosures) and the Lloyd–La Follette Act of 1912 (protecting congressional communications) supersede any restrictive language in the gag order. The addendum even incorporates by reference the language of those and other related good government and national security laws into every federally enforced gag order, as a prerequisite to be legally enforceable. It has been unanimously renewed every year since 1988.

== Background ==
The anti-gag statute was first passed in response to Reagan administration nondisclosure agreements, primarily known as SF 189 and SF 312, which employees had to sign as a prerequisite to keep or obtain their security clearances. The forms were gag orders that would have effectively created a back door Official Secrets Act for 2.4 million clearance holders if implemented as planned. The agreements were to be enforced through loss of clearance and felony prosecution for releasing any “classifiable” information without advance approval.

What did “classifiable” mean? Steve Garfinkel, President Ronald Reagan’s chief of the Information Security Oversight Office (ISOO) that implemented SF 189, informed Congress that it meant anything that could or should have been classified, or “virtually anything.” In other words, without advance permission, whistleblowers could be prosecuted based on an after-the-fact call that almost any information they released was classified. “Classifiable” would have created a new hybrid secrecy, or “pseudo-classification” category that imposed sweeping prior restraint for admittedly less sensitive information.

After 1.7 million federal employees and contractors acquiesced by signing SF 189, Pentagon whistleblower Ernie Fitzgerald sparked a legislative and legal counterattack by refusing to do so. At one of numerous congressional hearings on the matter, Sen. Charles Grassley (R-IA) characterized the administration's non-disclosure policy as an effort to “place a blanket of silence over all information generated by the government.”3 As a counter-attack, in 1988, Congress banned spending on SF 189. The Administration withdrew the form and substituted a new one, but the only change was to replace “classifiable” with “unmarked but classified.” Critics rejected the impact as disingenuous and meaningless, because whistleblowers still would have to seek advance approval from their supervisors to know for certain whether making a disclosure would be a crime.

After Congress enacted the spending ban, the Administration filed a constitutional challenge that went to the Supreme Court, arguing that the law infringed on the Commander in Chief's powers. After the Supreme Court temporarily ducked the issue, Congress in 1989 rewrote the spending ban in its current language, which has not been challenged. The final anti-gag statute circumvents the Administration's constitutional challenge by requiring the President to obey the relevant good government and national security laws he already signed. Although the law's roots involve a national security controversy, its language sets the terms for lawful-spending to enforce any Executive branch restriction on free speech rights.

== Renewed threat ==
The campaign to put enforcement teeth in the anti-gag statute has become even more significant, due to two recent factors. First, there has been an increasing number of national security and non-national security gag orders during the last few years. Critics have called these illegally broad. Gag orders have been used in attempts to silence America's top government scientists on matters ranging from the secret additional $800 million in the prescription drug bill, to U.S. Food and Drug Administration (FDA) cover-ups of knowledge about dangerous drugs such as Vioxx, to the most alarming scientific research on the imminent threat from global warming. Second, while the term "classifiable" was removed from executive gag orders in 1989, new designations similar to "classifiable" have developed. These include "Sensitive, but Unclassified," "Sensitive Security Information," and "Critical Infrastructure Information" (a congressionally created version from the Patriot Act). They all have the same characteristics – employment and criminal liability for non-classified disclosures of arguably anything without prior permission. In fact, their threat is greater than the original Reagan-era nondisclosure policy, because these restrictions impose an Official Secrets Act on every federal employee or contractor, not just those with security clearances.

The new hybrid secrecy categories also have been used to camouflage phony announcements of free speech reform. To illustrate, NASA recently issued a new media policy to quell the controversy around an unsuccessful attempt to gag its top climate change scientist, James Hansen. The policy appears to respect employees' free speech rights as private citizens, but there is an all-encompassing loophole: the policy defies the WPA by requiring prior approval for all whistleblower disclosures that are "Sensitive But Unclassified" (SBU). The legal definition of SBU is overly broad and vague, and potentially can sweep in any information. Illustrative definitions include the Energy Department's ("information for which disclosure … could adversely affect national security or government interests") and the State Department's ("information which, if released, could result in or harm or unfair treatment to any individual or group"). NASA's own procedures do not define the term explicitly, but explain that it replaces the broad category "For Official Use Only."

== Impact ==
Like the Lloyd–Lafollete Act protecting communications with Congress, the anti-gag statute has been an effective weapon for lawyers to discredit, negotiate and generally call repressive government bluffs. On the micro level, it is a resource that the Government Accountability Project (GAP) has consistently used in challenging gag orders and retaliatory investigations to enforce them.

On the macro level, however, the anti-gag statute suffers from the same defect as the Lloyd Lafollette Act: it is a right without a remedy. Those victimized by its violation do not have any formal legal access to enforce the right. Further, because it is an annual appropriations rider, it will expire unless specifically passed each year.

== Relevance of pending whistleblower legislation ==
Past Senate and House legislation, S.494 and H.R. 1317 respectively, would permanently codify the anti-gag statute's provisions. The bills also make issuing a gag order without the law's mandatory addendum/notification requirement a prohibited personnel practice under the CSRA. S. 494 bars Critical Infrastructure Information status from canceling whistleblower rights. H.R. 1317 does not, although H.R. 5112 has an alternate approach to control all pseudo-classification categories.
