= Zobel v. Williams =

- Supreme Court of the United States

Decided June 14, 1982
- Full case name: Zobel v. Williams
- Citations: 457 U.S. 55 (more)

Holding
- Distinguishing bounty benefits based on the length of time a person has resided in a state violates the Equal Protection Clause.

Court membership
- Chief Justice Warren E. Burger Associate Justices William J. Brennan Jr. · Byron White; Thurgood Marshall · Harry Blackmun; Lewis F. Powell Jr. · William Rehnquist; John P. Stevens · Sandra Day O'Connor

Case opinions
- Majority: Burger, joined by Brennan, White, Marshall, Blackmun, Powell, Stevens
- Concurrence: Brennan, joined by Blackmun, Powell
- Concurrence: O'Connor
- Dissent: Rehnquist

Laws applied
- Equal Protection Clause

Zobel v. Williams, 457 U.S. 55 (1982), was a United States Supreme Court case in which the Court held that distinguishing bounty benefits based on the length of time a person has resided in a state violates the Equal Protection Clause.

In 1967, Alaska received a windfall in oil revenues after the discovery of large oil reserves on the state-owned land of Prudhoe Bay area. During the 1981 fiscal year, the state received $3.7 billion in petroleum revenues. By constitutional amendment, the state established a Permanent Fund to invest at least 25% of this annual mineral income and it established a dividend program distributing the Fund's earnings to its adult residents (Alaska Const., Art. IC, Section 15). Each resident would receive annual earnings proportional to the number of years they were Alaskan residents after statehood was established in 1959. For instance, in 1979, a one-year resident would receive $50 (one dividend unit), whereas a person who had been a resident for twenty-one years would receive $1,050 (twenty-one dividend units).

In an action brought by Alaskan residents since 1978, the Court held that the dividend program violated their rights under the Equal Protection Clause of the Fourteenth Amendment, denying them the full rights of Alaskan citizenship enjoyed on the same terms as other state citizens. The first two objectives of the dividend program, to incentivize Alaskan residency and prudent Fund management, were not rationally related to the preferential treatment granted to certain Alaskan residents. Even if dividends could incentivize residing in Alaska, starting the countdown from the year of statehood, rather than the year of enactment, did not serve this end. The same could be said of the goal of incentivizing prudent Fund management. The final legislative objective, to reward state citizens for their past contributions, was an illegitimate state purpose, as it would permit states to apportion other state benefits according to the length of residency, which would be "clearly impermissible."
