= Globe Newspaper Co. v. Superior Court =

- Supreme Court of the United States

Argued March 29, 1982 Decided June 23, 1982
- Full case name: Globe Newspaper Co. v. Superior Court, County of Norfolk
- Docket no.: 81-611
- Citations: 457 U.S. 596 (more)
- Argument: Oral argument

Holding
- The exclusion of the press and public from a trial is prohibited by the First Amendment unless the exclusion is motivated by a compelling state interest.

Court membership
- Chief Justice Warren E. Burger Associate Justices William J. Brennan Jr. · Byron White; Thurgood Marshall · Harry Blackmun; Lewis F. Powell Jr. · William Rehnquist; John P. Stevens · Sandra Day O'Connor

Case opinions
- Majority: Brennan, joined by White, Marshall, Blackmun, Powell
- Concurrence: O'Connor
- Dissent: Burger, joined by Rehnquist
- Dissent: Stevens

Laws applied
- U.S. Const. amend. I

Globe Newspaper Co. v. Superior Court, 457 U.S. 596 (1982), was a United States Supreme Court case in which the court held that the exclusion of the press and public from a trial is prohibited by the First Amendment unless the exclusion is motivated by a compelling state interest.

== Background ==
Under Chapter 278 Section 16A of the General Laws of Massachusetts, a trial court was required to exclude the press and general public from the courtroom during the testimony of an underaged victim in trials for specified sexual offenses.

During the preliminary proceedings of a rape trial, the trial court ordered the courtroom closed as required by the law. The Globe Newspaper subsequently requested the order be revoked, arguing that it had a First Amendment right to witness the trial. The trial court denied the motion.

Soon after, the Globe sought relief from the Supreme Court of Massachusetts. The request was denied. While an appeal to the full court progressed, the trial continued and resulted in a conviction.

The full court held that the provision was over-applied in the particular case, but did not rule on the merits of the First Amendment claim, awaiting the pending decision in Richmond Newspapers, Inc. v. Virginia. Following the release of that decision, the court held that the exclusions furthered genuine state interests, and that the statue was sufficiently narrowly scoped to be constitutional.

The Globe petitioned the Supreme Court for review.

== Opinion of the court ==
The Supreme Court reversed on appeal.
