= Arizona v. Maricopa County Medical Society =

1982 United States Supreme Court case

- Supreme Court of the United States

Argued November 4, 1981 Decided June 18, 1982
- Full case name: Arizona v. Maricopa County Medical Society
- Citations: 457 U.S. 332 (more) 102 S. Ct. 2466; 73 L. Ed. 2d 48

Case history
- Prior: 643 F.2d 553 (9th Cir. 1980)

Holding
- The maximum fee agreements, as price-fixing agreements, are per se unlawful under § 1 of the Sherman Antitrust Act.

Court membership
- Chief Justice Warren E. Burger Associate Justices William J. Brennan Jr. · Byron White; Thurgood Marshall · Harry Blackmun; Lewis F. Powell Jr. · William Rehnquist; John P. Stevens · Sandra Day O'Connor

Case opinions
- Majority: Stevens, joined by Brennan, White, Marshall
- Dissent: Powell, joined by Burger, Rehnquist
- Blackmun, O'Connor took no part in the consideration or decision of the case.

Laws applied
- Sherman Antitrust Act of 1890

Arizona v. Maricopa County Medical Society, 457 U.S. 332 (1982), was a U.S. Supreme Court case involving antitrust law. A society of doctors in Maricopa County, Arizona, established maximum fees that their members could claim for seeing patients who were covered by certain health insurance plans. Arizona charged them with violations of state antitrust law regarding price fixing. The society tried to rebut the state's charges by claiming that the maximum-fee arrangement was necessary to allow doctors to see these patients, and therefore generated economic benefits.

On appeal, the Supreme Court rejected this defense, saying that price fixing was not truly necessary here: the society could have used insurance to pool their risk. The society's efficiency justification was either a pretext, or else could have been done through less restrictive means. The Court held that their justifications failed as a matter of fact.

== Facts ==
Maricopa County Medical Society, by agreement of their member doctors, established the maximum fees the doctors may claim in full payment for health services provided to policyholders of specified insurance plans. Arizona filed a complaint against MCMS in Federal District Court, alleging that they were engaged in an illegal price-fixing conspiracy in violation of the Sherman Antitrust Act.

== Judgment ==
In a 4–3 decision, the court held that the maximum fee agreements, as price-fixing agreements, are per se unlawful under § 1 of the Sherman Act.

== Significance ==
The ruling stipulates not just that maximum price fixing among competitors is unlawful, but that it is unlawful per se. This precludes any significant inquiry into potential procompetitive justifications for such an arrangement. According to one author, the result of the decision was to make "antitrust analysis once again confused and haphazard."

== See also ==
- US antitrust law
- List of United States Supreme Court cases, volume 457
- Kiefer-Stewart Co. v. Seagram & Sons, Inc.
- Albrecht v. Herald Co.
