= Saucier v. Katz =

- Supreme Court of the United States

Argued March 20, 2001 Decided June 18, 2001
- Full case name: Donald Saucier, Petitioner v. Elliot M. Katz and In Defense Of Animals
- Citations: 533 U.S. 194 (more) 121 S. Ct. 2151; 150 L. Ed. 2d 272; 2001 U.S. LEXIS 4664; 69 U.S.L.W. 4481; 2001 Cal. Daily Op. Service 5000; 2001 Daily Journal DAR 6137; 2001 Colo. J. C.A.R. 3134; 14 Fla. L. Weekly Fed. S 361
- Argument: Oral argument

Case history
- Prior: Certiorari to the United States Court of Appeals for the Ninth Circuit

Holding
- A qualified immunity ruling requires an analysis that is not susceptible to fusion with the question of whether unreasonable force was used in making the arrest.

Court membership
- Chief Justice William Rehnquist Associate Justices John P. Stevens · Sandra Day O'Connor; Antonin Scalia · Anthony Kennedy; David Souter · Clarence Thomas; Ruth Bader Ginsburg · Stephen Breyer

Case opinions
- Majority: Kennedy, joined by Rehnquist, O'Connor, Scalia, Thomas; Souter (Parts I and II)
- Concurrence: Ginsburg (in judgment), joined by Stevens, Breyer
- Concur/dissent: Souter

Laws applied
- U.S. Const. amend. IV
- Overruled by
- Pearson v. Callahan, 555 U.S. 223 (2009)

Saucier v. Katz, 533 U.S. 194 (2001), was a United States Supreme Court case in which the Court considered the qualified immunity of a police officer to a civil rights case brought through a Bivens action.

== Background ==
In 1994, the Presidio Army Base in San Francisco, California, was the site of an event to celebrate the conversion of the base to a national park. Elliot Katz, the president of a group called In Defense of Animals, brought a cloth banner, approximately 4 by 3 feet, that read "Please Keep Animal Torture Out of Our National Parks," to voice opposition to the possibility that the Letterman Army Hospital might be used for experiments on animals.

While Vice President Al Gore began giving a speech, Katz removed the banner from his jacket, started to unfold it, and walked toward the fence and speakers' platform. Petitioner Donald Saucier, a military police officer on duty that day, had been warned by his superiors of the possibility of demonstrations with Katz being previously identified as a potential protester. Saucier and Sergeant Steven Parker, another military police officer, moved to intercept Katz as he walked toward the fence. As Katz reached the barrier and began placing the banner on the other side, the officers grabbed Katz from behind, took the banner, and rushed him out of the area. Each officer had one of Katz's arms, half-walking, half-dragging him, with his feet "barely touching the ground." Saucier and Parker took Katz to a nearby military van, where, Katz claims, he was shoved or thrown inside.

Katz brought an action in the United States District Court for the Northern District of California against Saucier and other officials pursuant to Bivens v. Six Unknown Named Agents, alleging that the defendants had violated his Fourth Amendment rights by using excessive force to arrest him.

== Decision ==
The Supreme Court, in an opinion delivered by Justice Kennedy, held that Saucier was entitled to qualified immunity.

The Supreme Court held that qualified immunity analysis must proceed in two steps. A court must first ask whether "the facts alleged show the officer’s conduct violated a constitutional right." Then, if a constitutional right were violated, the court would determine whether the constitutional right was "clearly established."

In its 2009 decision in Pearson v. Callahan the Supreme Court modified the two-step immunity analysis imposed in Saucier to make its application less restrictive. Saucier required courts to confront the first prong of the analysis before they moved on to the second, but Pearson says, "the Saucier protocol should not be regarded as mandatory in all cases."

Pearson goes on to say, "Our decision does not prevent the lower courts from following the Saucier procedure; it simply recognizes that those courts should have the discretion to decide whether that procedure is worthwhile in particular cases."

== See also ==
- List of United States Supreme Court cases, volume 533
- List of United States Supreme Court cases
