= List of United States Supreme Court cases, volume 457 =

This is a list of all United States Supreme Court cases from volume 457 of the United States Reports:

Case name	Citation	Date decided
Rodríguez v. Popular Democratic Party	457 U.S. 1	1982
Jackson Transit Auth. v. Transit Union	457 U.S. 15	1982
Tibbs v. Florida	457 U.S. 31	1982
Johnson v. Bd. of Ed.	457 U.S. 52	1982
Zobel v. Williams	457 U.S. 55	1982
Cory v. White	457 U.S. 85	1982
Steelworkers v. Sadlowski	457 U.S. 102	1982
Blum v. Bacon	457 U.S. 132	1982
Gen. Tel. Co. v. Falcon	457 U.S. 147	1982
California v. Texas	457 U.S. 164	1982
Texas v. Oklahoma	457 U.S. 172	1982
Sumitomo Shoji Am., Inc. v. Avagliano	457 U.S. 176	1982
Diedrich v. Comm'r	457 U.S. 191	1982
Plyler v. Doe	457 U.S. 202	1982
Hathorn v. Lovorn	457 U.S. 255	1982
California ex rel. State Lands Comm'n v. United States	457 U.S. 273	1982
Mills v. Rogers	457 U.S. 291	1982
Youngberg v. Romeo	457 U.S. 307	1982
Arizona v. Maricopa Cnty. Med. Soc'y	457 U.S. 332	1982
United States v. Goodwin	457 U.S. 368	1982
California v. Grace Brethren Church	457 U.S. 393	1982
Middlesex Cnty. Ethics Comm. v. Garden State Bar Assn.	457 U.S. 423	1982
Connecticut v. Teal	457 U.S. 440	1982
Blue Shield v. McCready	457 U.S. 465	1982
Patsy v. Bd. of Regents	457 U.S. 496	1982
United States v. Johnson (1982)	457 U.S. 537	1982
Schweiker v. Hogan	457 U.S. 569	1982
Schmidt v. Oakland Unified Sch. Dist.	457 U.S. 594	1982
Globe Newspaper Co. v. Super. Ct.	457 U.S. 596	1982
Edgar v. MITE Corp.	457 U.S. 624	1982
Foremost Ins. Co. v. Richardson	457 U.S. 668	1982
Taylor v. Alabama	457 U.S. 687	1982
Jacksonville Bulk Terminals, Inc. v. Longshoremen	457 U.S. 702	1982
Nixon v. Fitzgerald	457 U.S. 731	1982
Harlow v. Fitzgerald	457 U.S. 800	1982
Rendell-Baker v. Kohn	457 U.S. 830	1982
Island Trees School District v. Pico	457 U.S. 853	1982
Lugar v. Edmondson Oil Co.	457 U.S. 922	1982
Clements v. Fashing	457 U.S. 957	1982
Blum v. Yaretsky	457 U.S. 991	1982
