= United States v. Johnson (1982) =

- Supreme Court of the United States

Argued February 24, 1982 Decided June 21, 1982
- Full case name: United States v. Raymond Eugene Johnson
- Citations: 457 U.S. 537 (more) 102 S. Ct. 2579; 73 L. Ed. 2d 202; 1982 U.S. LEXIS 134; 50 U.S.L.W. 4742

Case history
- Prior: Cert. to the United States Court of Appeals for the Ninth Circuit

Holding
- A decision of this Court construing the Fourth Amendment is to be applied retroactively to all convictions that were not yet final at the time the decision was rendered, except where a case would be clearly controlled by existing retroactivity precedents.

Court membership
- Chief Justice Warren E. Burger Associate Justices William J. Brennan Jr. · Byron White; Thurgood Marshall · Harry Blackmun; Lewis F. Powell Jr. · William Rehnquist; John P. Stevens · Sandra Day O'Connor

Case opinions
- Majority: Blackmun, joined by Brennan, Marshall, Powell, Stevens
- Concurrence: Brennan
- Dissent: White, joined by Burger, Rehnquist, O'Connor

United States v. Johnson, 457 U.S. 537 (1982), was a United States Supreme Court case.

== Background ==
United States Secret Service agents arrested a suspect at his home without an arrest warrant. Before trial, the defendant sought to suppress his oral and written statements as fruits of an unlawful arrest not supported by probable cause. The United States District Court found the arrest to be proper and admitted the evidence, and a jury then convicted the defendant of a federal crime. The Ninth Circuit affirmed the judgment of conviction.

While the defendant's petition for rehearing was pending before the Court of Appeals, the United States Supreme Court decided Payton v. New York, 445 U.S. 573 (1980), in which it was held that the Fourth Amendment prohibits the police from making a warrantless and nonconsensual entry into a suspect's home to make a routine felony arrest. The Court of Appeals granted the defendant's petition for rehearing, withdrew its prior opinion, and on the strength of Payton v. New York reversed the judgment of conviction. The government petitioned for rehearing, arguing that the principles of Payton should not apply retroactively to an arrest that had occurred before Payton was decided. The Court of Appeals disagreed, denied the petition for rehearing, and amended its opinion to clarify that Payton did apply retroactively.

== Opinion of the Court ==
On certiorari, the United States Supreme Court affirmed 5-4. In an opinion by Blackmun, J., it was held that the rule announced in Payton v. New York applies to a case which was pending on direct appeal when Payton was decided, Payton not having applied settled precedent to a new set of facts, not having announced an entirely new and unanticipated principle of law, nor having held either that the trial court lacked authority to convict the defendant nor that the Fourth Amendment immunized his conduct from punishment.

Brennan, concurring, expressed the view that the court's decision left undisturbed the Court's retroactivity precedents as applied to convictions final at the time of decision.

White wrote the dissent, expressing the view that retroactive application of a new constitutional doctrine is appropriate when that doctrine's major purpose is to overcome an aspect of the criminal trial that substantially impairs its truth-finding function and so raises serious questions about the accuracy of guilty verdicts in past trials and that new extensions of the exclusionary rule do not serve this purpose and will not generally be applied retroactively, and that there was nothing extraordinary about the ruling in Payton to justify an exception to this general rule.
