= Pearson v. Callahan =

- Supreme Court of the United States

Argued October 14, 2008 Decided January 21, 2009
- Full case name: Cordell Pearson, et al., Petitioners v. Afton Callahan
- Docket no.: 07-751
- Citations: 555 U.S. 223 (more) 129 S. Ct. 808, 172 L. Ed. 2d 565; 2009 U.S. LEXIS 591
- Argument: Oral argument

Case history
- Prior: District court granted summary judgment to defendants, Callahan v. Millard County, No. 2:04-CV-00952 (D. Utah, May 18, 2006), 2006 WL 1409130; appeals court affirmed in part and reversed in part, 494 F.3d 891 (10th Cir. 2007); cert. granted, 552 U.S. 1279 (2008).
- Subsequent: On remand, appeals court affirmed district court's grant of summary judgment, 557 F.3d 1140 (10th Cir. 2009).

Holding
- Saucier v. Katz's two-step process is no longer mandatory. Courts using that test may analyze the two steps in whatever order is most appropriate in a particular case.

Court membership
- Chief Justice John Roberts Associate Justices John P. Stevens · Antonin Scalia; Anthony Kennedy · David Souter; Clarence Thomas · Ruth Bader Ginsburg; Stephen Breyer · Samuel Alito

Case opinion
- Majority: Alito, joined by unanimous
- This case overturned a previous ruling or rulings
- Saucier v. Katz (2001)

Pearson v. Callahan, 555 U.S. 223 (2009), was a case decided by the United States Supreme Court dealing with the doctrine of qualified immunity.

The case centered on the application of mandatory sequencing in determining qualified immunity as set by the 2001 decision, Saucier v. Katz, in which courts were to first ask whether a constitutional right was clearly violated by a government official at the time of the action before evaluating if a law had clearly been broken. The Court took to the unusual step of asking the parties to argue whether past precedent should be overturned. The theory under Saucier is that without courts first ruling on constitutional questions, the law would go undeveloped in many areas. Many legal commentators have criticized the ruling in Saucier.

The Supreme Court, in its opinion, withdrew the mandatory sequencing required under Saucier, giving courts the discretion of asking the constitutional or law question first. While this discretionary approach can free resources of the court, it has led to additional criticism, as it can often favor defendants, particularly in cases involving excessive force and police brutality.

== Background ==
In 2002, a confidential police informant working with five officers from the Central Utah Narcotics Task Force went undercover at the Fillmore, Utah mobile home of a suspected drug dealer, Afton D. Callahan, to purchase $100 worth of methamphetamine. The officers had arranged for the informant, who was "wired" with a listening device, to give them a sign indicating a successful drug deal; when he did, they entered the home.

The case focuses on "consent once removed," a theory espoused by some lower courts that acts as an exception to the search warrant requirement of the Fourth Amendment. Under the doctrine, if a suspect to a crime opens the door for an undercover police officer, the suspect unknowingly is also allowing further police officers to enter without a warrant. In the criminal case at issue in this civil case, the police officers sent an undercover informant in to make a drug deal. When the informant succeeded, the police officers then entered Callahan's home without a warrant. The police in the case argued that "consent once removed" applied, since the informant was acting as an agent of the police.

The criminal charges against Callahan were prosecuted in Utah state court. The judge rejected Callahan's argument that the evidence obtained from the search was not admissible because the search was unconstitutional, and Callahan accepted a conditional guilty plea while he appealed the judgment. A Utah appeals court found the search unconstitutional and overturned the guilty verdict.

Callahan then filed a civil lawsuit against five members of the Central Utah Narcotics Task Force who had conducted the search, claiming they violated his Fourth Amendment rights. If the case was not decided in the officers' favor, they would face the prospect of paying monetary damages to the plaintiff. The officers claimed that they could not be sued due to qualified immunity, a doctrine that states government officials cannot be held liable for violating a facet of the Constitution that is unclear.

The question had divided lower courts, which disagreed about the "consent once removed" doctrine. Federal judge Paul G. Cassell said in 2006 that even if the search was unconstitutional, the police officers could be granted immunity because at the time of the search, it would have been reasonable for them to believe that it was constitutional. He noted that three federal circuits abided by "consent once removed," although not the Tenth, in whose jurisdiction Utah falls.

However, the U.S. Court of Appeals for the Tenth Circuit ruled against the officers' claim of immunity and allowed Callahan to proceed with the lawsuit. The court did not adopt "consent once removed" as other federal circuits have done. The appeals court said that a reasonable police officer would have known not to proceed in the case without a warrant.

== Supreme Court case ==
The Supreme Court agreed to hear the case in March 2008.

The Court added another issue to the officers' request for certiorari: how to deal with officers' requests for immunity from constitutional issues. This issue was last heard in the Supreme Court in 2001 in Saucier v. Katz, in which the Court ruled that such suits had to be adjudicated in two phases: first, deciding the constitutionality, and then deciding if the law had been unclear enough for officers not to be liable. Saucier v. Katz is widely criticized because it has resulted in judges spending time deciding difficult constitutional issues, even in cases where official immunity obviously applies and the case will eventually be thrown out. One such case that went to the Supreme Court was Morse v. Frederick.

== Supreme Court decision ==
The Court's decision severely limited Saucier v. Katz 533 U.S. 194 (2001). The Court modified Saucier's two-step inquiry in two ways. First, it eliminated the requirement that qualified immunity issues be considered in order. Thus, courts after Pearson can first consider whether federal law forbidding an action was clearly established at the time of that action, instead of first analyzing the sometimes more difficult question of whether the law actually forbade the action, regardless of its clarity. Second, it made Saucier's two-step process advisory. The Court said: "we conclude that, while the sequence set forth (in Saucier v. Katz) is often appropriate, it should no longer be regarded as mandatory."

== Consequences ==
This case allowed judges to skip the question of whether or not a police officer used excessive force and to focus solely on whether or not the conduct violated clearly established law, which appeal courts have frequently done. Some legal experts assert that this has created a "closed loop" in which "the case law gets frozen" because it largely prevents the introduction of case law that clearly establishes new instances of the use of excessive force.

== See also ==
- List of United States Supreme Court cases by the Roberts Court
- List of United States Supreme Court cases, volume 555
- List of United States Supreme Court cases
