= A. Ernest Fitzgerald =

American engineer and whistleblower (1926–2019)

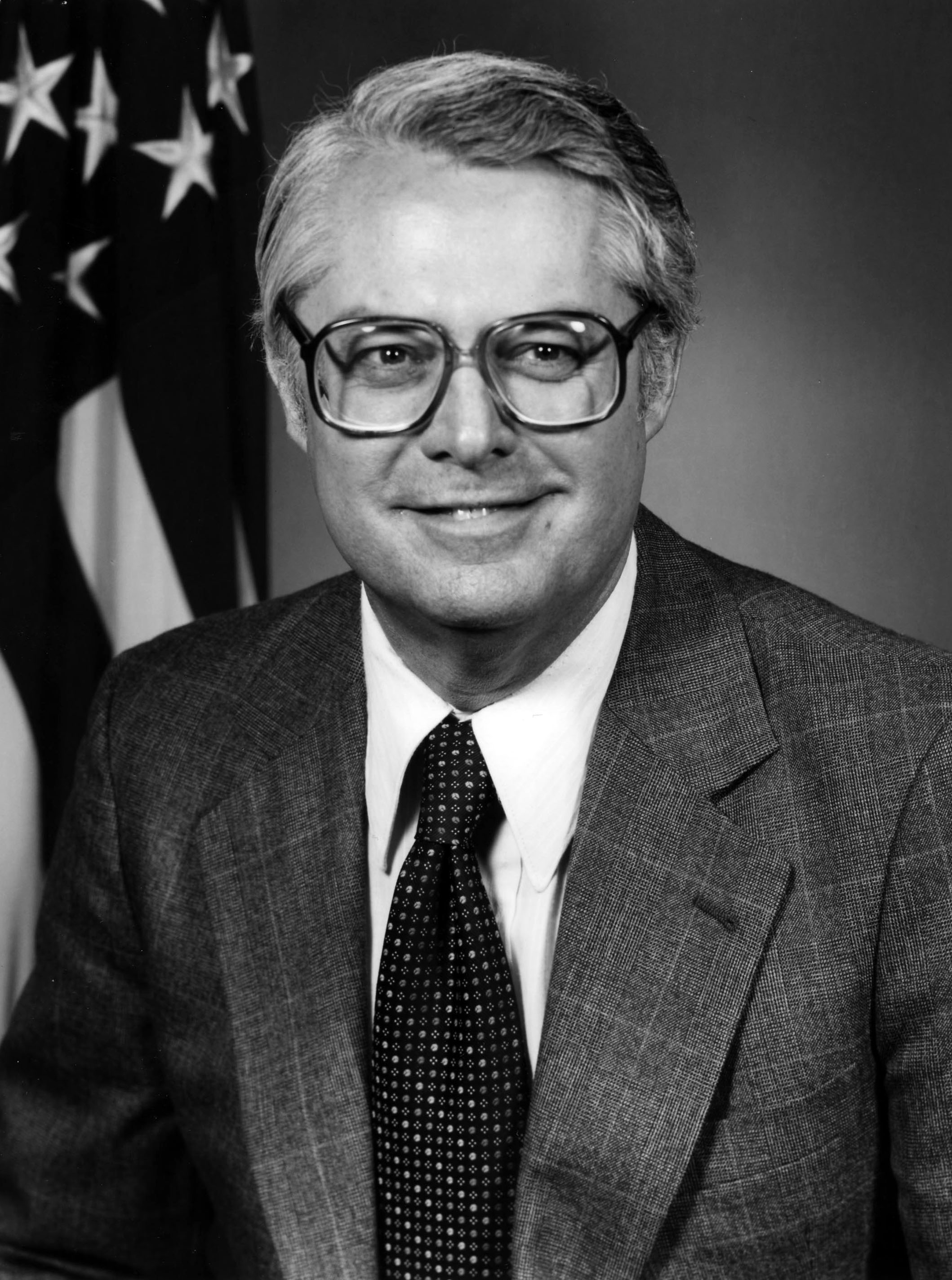
- Born: Arthur Ernest Fitzgerald; July 31, 1926; Birmingham, Alabama, U.S.
- Died: January 31, 2019 (aged 92); Falls Church, Virginia, U.S.
- Education: University of Alabama (BS)
- Occupation: Engineer
- Employer: United States Air Force
- Known for: Pentagon whistleblower
- Military career
- Allegiance: United States of America
- Branch: United States Navy

Arthur Ernest "Ernie" Fitzgerald (July 31, 1926 – January 31, 2019) was an American engineer, a member of the Senior Executive Service in the United States Air Force, and a prominent U.S. government whistleblower.

Following service in the U.S. Navy during World War II, Fitzgerald earned a Bachelor of Science degree in industrial engineering from the University of Alabama in 1951. He was a registered professional engineer and worked on several successful patents, including one issued in his name.

Fitzgerald was best known as a civilian member of the Senior Executive Service, a management systems deputy, Office of the Assistant Secretary of the Air Force for Financial Management and Comptroller, Headquarters U.S. Air Force, Washington, D.C. He was responsible for the development of improved management controls generally, specifically including management information control systems, economic cost effectiveness analysis, statistical programs and analysis, cost estimating and analysis, and productivity enhancement and measurement. The latter responsibility includes supervising Air Force performance measurement activities. It was from this position that he became a whistleblower about waste in military spending. He authored The High Priests of Waste in 1972 and The Pentagonists in 1989.

On January 31, 2019, Fitzgerald died in Falls Church, Virginia, at the age of 92.

== Career ==
After working for a number of years as an engineer and in management, Fitzgerald was employed by the U.S. Air Force as Deputy for Management Systems in 1965. While employed at the Pentagon Fitzgerald testified to Congress in 1968 and 1969 about the concealed cost overruns and the technical problems of the Lockheed C-5A transport airplane. He was accused of revealing classified information and was fired on order of President Richard M. Nixon.

He later successfully appealed to the Civil Service Commission to be reinstated. Furthermore, he was involved in several legal cases that were significant in establishing presidential immunity and defining the rights of government employees, including the U.S. Supreme Court case Nixon v. Fitzgerald.

== Whistleblower ==
In 1968, Fitzgerald reported a $2.3 billion cost overrun in the Lockheed C-5 aircraft program. As a congressional witness before the Joint Economic Committee, he rejected the advice of Air Force officials and testified with candor and transparency about billions of dollars in avionics program cost overruns and other technical problems.

In response to Fitzgerald's testimony, President Richard M. Nixon directed that he be fired. It was reported that Nixon told aides to "get rid of that son of a bitch." In executing the president's order, Fitzgerald was ultimately terminated by Defense Secretary Melvin Laird.

Fitzgerald filed a civil lawsuit against Nixon and other government officials. Nixon contended that as president he enjoyed immunity for actions he took while in office. The trial court and the appellate court rejected Nixon's claim. Nixon appealed to the United States Supreme Court, which ruled in Nixon v. Fitzgerald (1982) that the president is entitled to absolute immunity from legal liability for civil damages based on his official acts. The Court, however, emphasized that the president is not necessarily immune from criminal charges stemming from his official or unofficial acts while he is in office. The Court found that "the President's absolute immunity extends to all acts within the 'outer perimeter' of his duties of office." The Fitzgerald decision was cited in 2024 during Supreme Court oral arguments by attorneys for former president Donald Trump, who asserted absolute immunity from criminal prosecution for actions he undertook while president.

Because of his candor and commitment to the truth, Fitzgerald was a driving force for whistleblower protections. Fitzgerald continued to fight a four-decade-long campaign against fraud, waste, and abuse within the department. On page 108 in his book The Pentagonists, he states that "The Carter Reform Act -- or, as many people I knew called it, the Carter Deform Act -- was a reckless reversal of governmental progress since 1883, and promised some dire developments."

== Career chronology ==
1. 1951–1953, quality control engineer, Stockham Valves and Fitting Co., Birmingham, Ala.
2. 1953–1954, quality control engineer, Hayes Aircraft Corp.
3. 1954–1957, senior plant industrial engineer, Kaiser Aluminum and Chemical Corp.
4. 1957–1961, managing associate and principal, Arthur Young and Co.
5. 1962–1965, president, Performance Technology Corp.
6. 1965–1970, deputy for management systems, U.S. Air Force
7. 1970–1973, consultant to Joint Economic Committee, House Post Office and Civil Service Commission, and corporate director of Rockland Industries
8. 1973–1982, deputy for productivity management, U.S. Air Force
9. 1982–2006, management systems deputy, Office of the Assistant Secretary of the Air Force for Financial Management and Comptroller, Headquarters U.S. Air Force, Washington, D.C.

== Awards and honors ==
- 1967 Air Force nominee, Department of Defense Distinguished Civilian Service Award
- 1973 Judge Henry T. Edgerton Award
- 1976 Freedom Award
- 1977 Marshall Engineers and Scientists Association Award
- 1986 Sigma Delta Chi First Amendment Award
- 1988 Cavallo Foundation Award
- 1989 First Amendment Award, Tau Beta Phi, Alpha Pi Mu and Phi Eta Sigma, Washington and Lee University, Lexington, Va.
- 1996 The Paul H. Douglas Ethics in Government Award

== Professional memberships and associations ==
- Institute of Industrial Engineering
- American Society for Quality Control
- Director, Fund for Constitutional Government
- Past chairman, National Taxpayers Union

== Books authored ==
- The High Priests of Waste (1972)
- The Pentagonists: An Insider's View of Waste, Mismanagement and Fraud in Defense Spending (1989).

== See also ==
- Anti-Gag Statute
- Office of the Inspector General, U.S. Department of Defense
- Department of Defense Whistleblower Program
