= Nixon v. Fitzgerald =

- Supreme Court of the United States

Argued November 30, 1981 Decided June 24, 1982
- Full case name: Richard Nixon v. A. Ernest Fitzgerald
- Citations: 457 U.S. 731 (more) 102 S. Ct. 2690; 73 L. Ed. 2d 349; 1982 U.S. LEXIS 42; 50 U.S.L.W. 4797
- Argument: Oral argument

Case history
- Prior: Cert. to the U.S. Court of Appeals for the District of Columbia Circuit

Holding
- The President is entitled to absolute immunity from civil liability for damages based on his official acts.

Court membership
- Chief Justice Warren E. Burger Associate Justices William J. Brennan Jr. · Byron White; Thurgood Marshall · Harry Blackmun; Lewis F. Powell Jr. · William Rehnquist; John P. Stevens · Sandra Day O'Connor

Case opinions
- Majority: Powell, joined by Burger, Rehnquist, Stevens, O'Connor
- Concurrence: Burger
- Dissent: White, joined by Brennan, Marshall, Blackmun
- Dissent: Blackmun, joined by Brennan, Marshall

Nixon v. Fitzgerald, 457 U.S. 731 (1982), was a United States Supreme Court decision written by Justice Lewis Powell dealing with presidential immunity from civil liability for actions taken while in office. The Court held that a president "is entitled to absolute immunity from damages liability predicated on his official acts."

== Background ==
Arthur Ernest Fitzgerald filed a lawsuit against government officials alleging that he had lost his position as a contractor for the U.S. Air Force because of testimony he gave before Congress in 1968. Among the defendants named in the lawsuit was ex-President Richard Nixon, who argued that a president cannot be sued for actions taken while he is in office.

The trial court and the appellate court rejected Nixon's claim of immunity. The case was then appealed to the Supreme Court.

== Opinion ==
In a 5–4 decision, the Court ruled that the president is entitled to absolute immunity from legal liability for civil damages based on his official acts. The Court found that "the President's absolute immunity extends to all acts within the 'outer perimeter' of his duties of office." The Court did not address the issue of immunity from criminal prosecution.

The Court noted that a grant of absolute immunity to the president would not leave him with unfettered power. It stated that there were formal and informal checks on presidential action that did not apply with equal force to other executive officials.

The Court observed that the president was subjected to constant scrutiny by the press and noted that vigilant oversight by Congress would also serve to deter presidential abuses of office and to make the threat of impeachment credible. It determined that other incentives to avoid presidential misconduct existed, including the desire to earn re-election, the need to maintain prestige as an element of presidential influence, and the traditional concern for his historical stature.

The decision was clarified by Clinton v. Jones, in which the Court held that a president is subject to civil suits for actions committed before he assumes the presidency.

== Legacy ==
In 2023, former president Donald Trump was indicted in four federal and state cases involving alleged criminal acts he undertook while president from 2017 to 2021. He contended that as president he had absolute immunity from criminal prosecution, arguing that all his actions were within the scope of his official duties as president. The matter was heard by the United States Supreme Court in April 2024. Trump attorneys cited Fitzgerald to support Trump's argument, while attorneys for the Smith special counsel investigation that was prosecuting Trump cited United States v. Nixon, the 1974 unanimous Supreme Court decision rejecting Nixon's claim of "absolute, unqualified Presidential privilege of immunity from judicial process under all circumstances." Smith attorneys argued the Fitzgerald precedent does not apply to federal criminal prosecutions. In July 2024, in its 2024 Trump v. United States ruling, the U.S. Supreme Court upheld the Fitzgerald decision in a 6–3 ruling and further stated in its majority opinion that a U.S. president could not be criminally prosecuted for some conduct committed as president which was regarded as official acts. However, it was still agreed that the U.S. president did not have broader immunity for conduct that was regarded as personal, unofficial acts.

== See also ==
- List of United States Supreme Court cases, volume 457
