= Rodríguez v. Popular Democratic Party =

Rodríguez v. Popular Democratic Party of Puerto Rico
- Supreme Court of the United States

Argued March 22, 1982 Decided June 7, 1982
- Full case name: Jesus Rivera Rodríguez, et al. v. Popular Democratic Party, et al.
- Citations: 457 U.S. 1 (more) 102 S. Ct. 2194; 72 L. Ed. 2d 628; 1982 U.S. LEXIS 115; 50 U.S.L.W. 4599

Case history
- Prior: Superior Court of Puerto Rico, Judgment for Popular Democratic Party
- Subsequent: Supreme Court of Puerto Rico, Judgment for Carlos Romero Barcelo, Governor of Puerto Rico

Holding
- Whether Puerto Rico may, by statute, vest in a political party the power to fill an interim vacancy in the Puerto Rico Legislature. The Supreme Court of Puerto Rico held that such a procedure did not violate the Constitution of the United States.

Court membership
- Chief Justice Warren E. Burger Associate Justices William J. Brennan Jr. · Byron White; Thurgood Marshall · Harry Blackmun; Lewis F. Powell Jr. · William Rehnquist; John P. Stevens · Sandra Day O'Connor

Case opinion
- Majority: Burger, joined by unanimous

Laws applied
- U.S. Const. article I, section 2, and US Const. Amendment 17, clause 2; Art. III, § 8. Article 5.006 of the Puerto Rico Electoral Law

Rodríguez v. Popular Democratic Party, 457 U.S. 1 (1982), was a case in which the Supreme Court of the United States heard on appeal from the Supreme Court of Puerto Rico whether Puerto Rico may by statute vest in a political party the power to fill an interim vacancy in the Puerto Rico Legislature. The Supreme Court of Puerto Rico held that such a procedure did not violate the United States Constitution, and the US Supreme Court upheld the decision of the Supreme Court of Puerto Rico. The case was of some interest to close followers of the Court as it featured the only return of former justice Abe Fortas, then in private practice, at oral argument on behalf of the appellee.

== Background ==
A member of appellee Popular Democratic Party (hereafter "appellee") who was elected in the November, 1980, general election to the Puerto Rico House of Representatives from District 31, died in 1981. The Governor of Puerto Rico subsequently called for a "by-election" — open to all qualified voters in District 31 — to fill the vacancy. Appellee then filed suit in the Superior Court of Puerto Rico, alleging that the Puerto Rico statutes under which the Governor purported to act authorized only candidates and electors affiliated with appellee to participate in the by-election. Appellants, qualified electors in District 31 who are not affiliated with appellee, intervened as defendants. The court entered judgment for appellee. The Puerto Rico Supreme Court modified the Superior Court's judgment, holding, among other things, that the pertinent statute, as properly construed, requires a by-election only if the party of the legislator vacating the seat fails to designate a replacement within 60 days after the vacancy occurs, and that, if the party selects a single candidate within such period, that candidate is declared "automatically elected to fill the vacancy." The court rejected appellants' contention that this procedure violated the Federal Constitution. While the case was pending before the Puerto Rico Supreme Court, appellee held a primary election in which only its members were permitted to participate, and which resulted in the selection of a person who, pursuant to the Supreme Court's mandate, was sworn in as the new representative from District 31.

== See also ==
- Plyler v. Doe, 457 U.S. 202 (1982)
