= United States House of Representatives =

Lower house of the U.S. Congress

Coordinates: 38°53′20″N 77°0′32″W

- 119th United States Congress
- Unofficial seal (Note: This emblem appears on the flag and is sometimes referred to as the seal of the House. However, the actual seal depicts the central part of the United States Capitol)

- Flag of the United States House of Representatives

Type
- Type: Lower house of the United States Congress
- Term limits: None

History
- New session started: January 3, 2025

Leadership
- Speaker: Mike Johnson (R) since October 25, 2023
- Majority Leader: Steve Scalise (R) since January 3, 2023
- Minority Leader: Hakeem Jeffries (D) since January 3, 2023
- Majority Whip: Tom Emmer (R) since January 3, 2023
- Minority Whip: Katherine Clark (D) since January 3, 2023

Structure
- Seats: 435 voting members 6 non-voting members 218 for a majority
- Political groups: Majority (219): Republican (218); Independent (1) (Note: Independent Rep. Kevin Kiley of California's 3rd congressional district caucuses with the Republican Party. Kiley was elected as a Republican.); Minority (214): Democratic (214); Vacant (2): Vacant (2)
- Length of term: 2 years

Elections
- Voting system: Plurality voting in 46 states (Note: Alaska (for its primary elections only), California, and Washington additionally utilize a nonpartisan blanket primary, and Mississippi uses the two-round system, for their respective primary elections.) Varies in 4 states: Alaska & Maine: Instant-runoff voting; Georgia & Louisiana: Two-round system; California & Washington: Nonpartisan primary
- Last election: November 3, 2026
- Next election: November 7, 2028
- Redistricting: State legislatures or redistricting commissions, varies by state

Meeting place
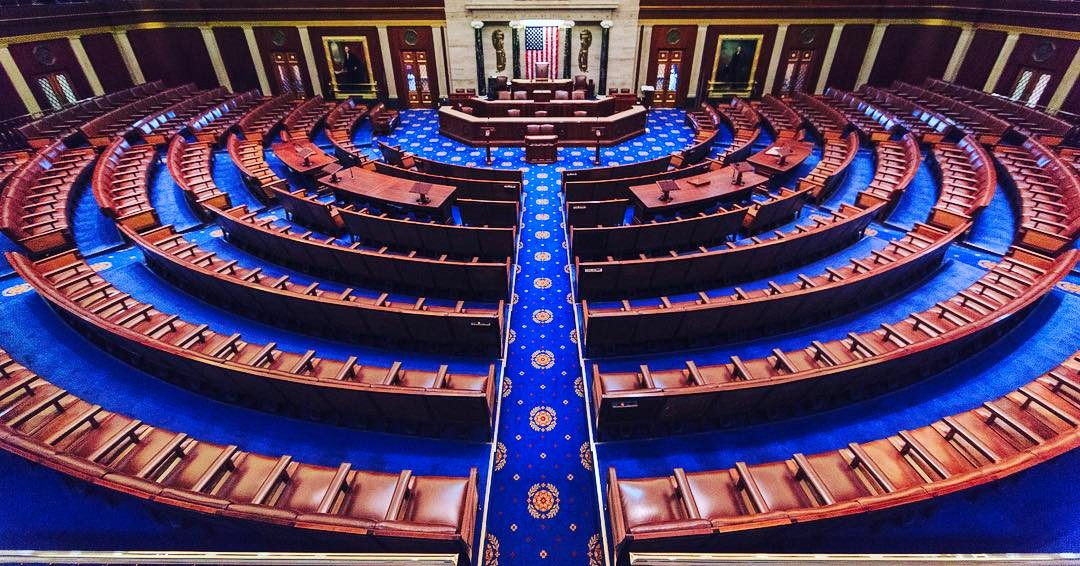
- House of Representatives Chamber; United States Capitol; Washington, D.C. United States

Website
- house.gov

Constitution
- United States Constitution

Rules
- Rules of the House of Representatives

The United States House of Representatives is a chamber of the bicameral United States Congress; it is the lower house, with the United States Senate being the upper house. Together, the House and Senate have the authority under Article One of the Constitution of the United States in enumerated matters to pass or defeat federal legislation, known as bills. Those that are also passed by the Senate are sent to the president for signature or veto. The House's exclusive powers include initiating all revenue bills, impeaching federal officers, and electing the president if no candidate receives a majority of votes in the Electoral College.

Members of the House serve a fixed term of two years, with each seat up for election before the start of the next Congress. Special elections may occur in the case of a vacancy. The House's composition was established by Article One of the United States Constitution. The House is composed of representatives who, pursuant to the Uniform Congressional District Act, sit in single member congressional districts allocated to each state on the basis of population as measured by the United States census, provided that each state gets at least one representative. Since its inception in 1789, all representatives have been directly elected. Although suffrage was initially limited, it gradually widened, particularly after the ratification of the Nineteenth Amendment and the civil rights movement.

Since 1913, the number of voting representatives has been at 435—with the exception of 1959 to 1963, when it was temporarily increased to 437 following the admissions of Alaska and Hawaii to the Union—pursuant to the Apportionment Act of 1911. The Reapportionment Act of 1929 capped the number of voting members of the House at 435.

Five non-voting delegates represent the District of Columbia and the U.S. territories of Guam, the U.S. Virgin Islands, the Commonwealth of the Northern Mariana Islands, and American Samoa. A non-voting resident commissioner, serving a four-year term, represents the Commonwealth of Puerto Rico. As of the 2020 census, the largest delegation was California, with 52 representatives. Six states have only one representative apiece: Alaska, Delaware, North Dakota, South Dakota, Vermont, and Wyoming.

The House meets in the south wing of the United States Capitol. The rules of the House generally address a two-party system, with a majority party in government, and a minority party in opposition. The presiding officer is the speaker of the House, who is elected by the members thereof. Other floor leaders are chosen by the Democratic Caucus or the Republican Conference, depending on whichever party has more voting members.

== History ==
=== 18th century ===
The representation of political parties as a percentage of the House of Representatives, 1788 to 2020

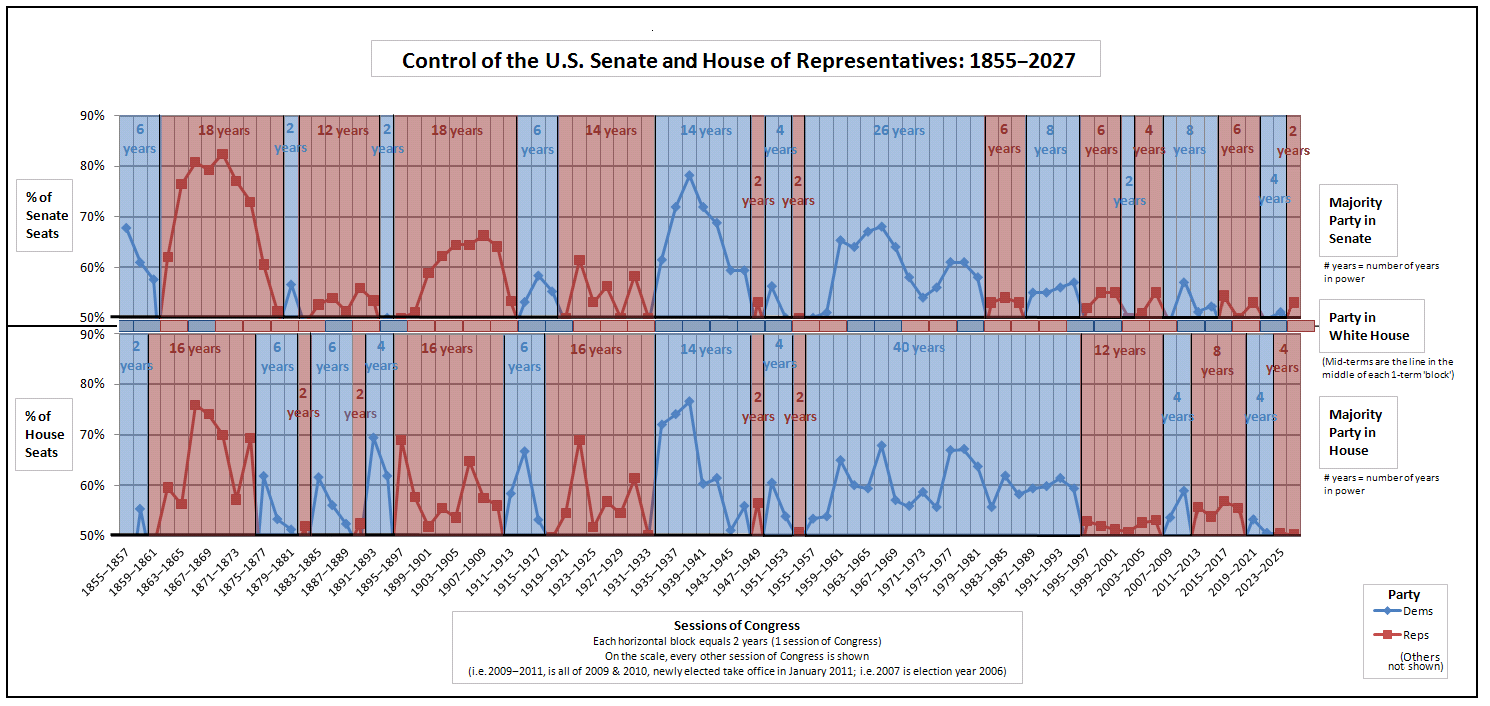
A historical graph of party control of the House, the U.S. Senate, and presidency, 1855 to 2025.

Under the Articles of Confederation, the Congress of the Confederation was a unicameral body with equal representation for each state. A simple majority of states was required for ordinary legislative matters. A supermajority of nine states or more was required for special matters listed in the Articles, such as engaging in war, entering treaties and alliances, coining money, appropriating money, borrowing money on credit of the United States, raising armies, and appointing a commander in chief of the military. An amendment to the Articles needed only a simple majority in the Congress but required each state to ratify it to become effective.

After eight years of a more limited confederal government under the Articles, James Madison, Alexander Hamilton, and other Founding Fathers initiated the Constitutional Convention, which convened in Philadelphia from May 25 to September 17, 1787, and received the Confederation Congress's sanction to "amend the Articles of Confederation". All states except Rhode Island agreed to send delegates.

Congress's structure was a contentious issue among the founders during the convention. Edmund Randolph's Virginia Plan called for bicameral legislature with proportional representation (Note: Not to be confused with proportional representation, an electoral system that typically elects multiple members of a party to a legislature based on that party's percentage of a popular vote.) in the House and Senate. The Virginia Plan drew the support of delegates from several large states, including Massachusetts, Pennsylvania, and Virginia, and called for representation based on population. The smaller states favored the New Jersey Plan, which called for a unicameral Congress with equal representation for the states.

The Convention ultimately reached the Connecticut Compromise or Great Compromise, under which the House of Representatives would provide representation proportional to each state's population, and the Senate would provide equal representation amongst the states. In 1788, the Constitution was ratified, and it was implemented on March 4, 1789.

Less than a month later, on April 1, 1789, the U.S. House convened for the first time in New York City, which was then the nation's capital. In 1790, the capital was moved back to Philadelphia, and the House met there from 1790 until 1800 when construction of the new national capitol in Washington, D.C. was completed.

=== 19th century ===
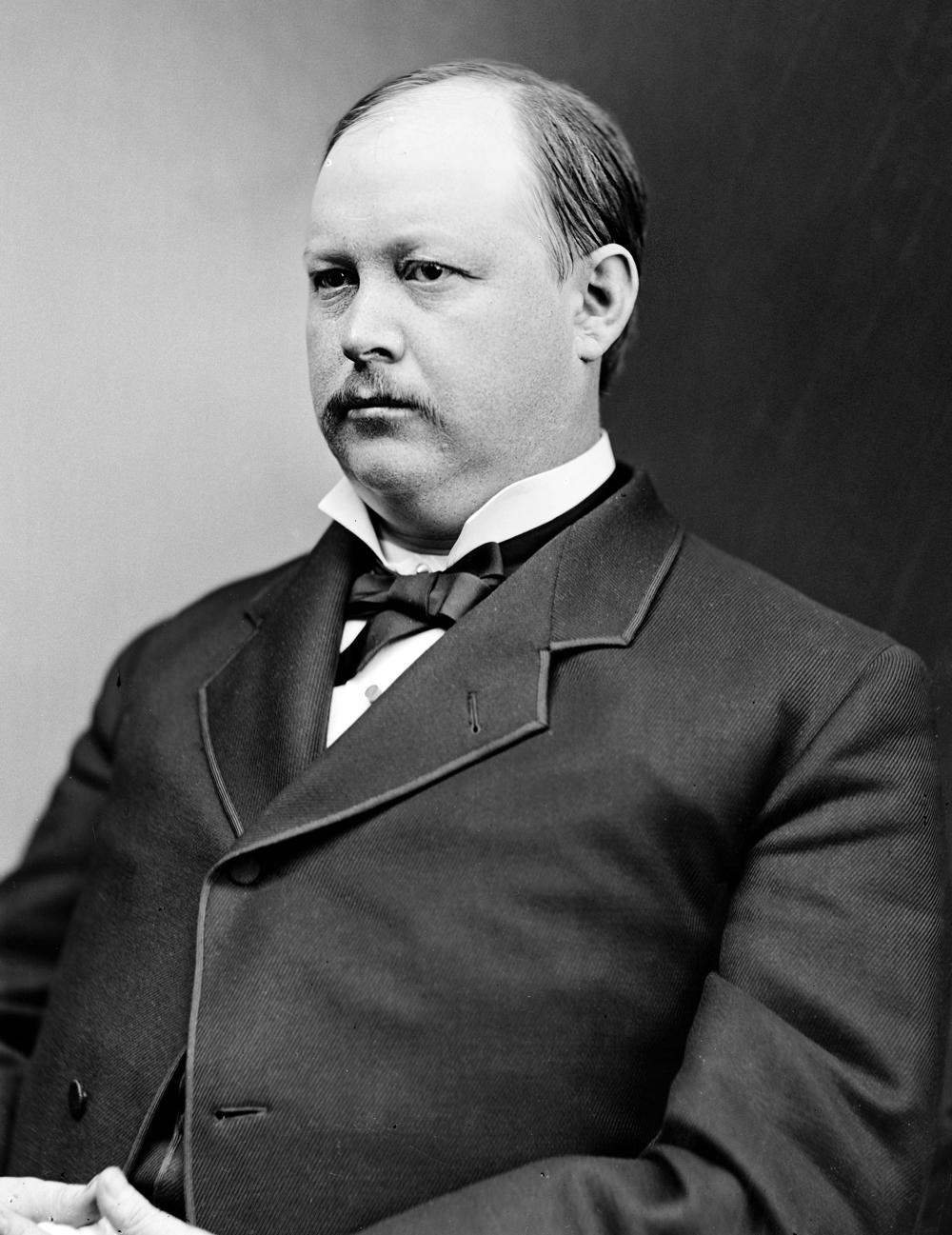
Thomas Brackett Reed, Republican House Speaker from 1895 to 1899.

During the first half of the 19th century, the House was frequently in conflict with the U.S. Senate over regionally divisive issues, including slavery. The North was much more populous than the South, and therefore dominated the House of Representatives; the North held no such advantage in the Senate, however, where the equal representation of states prevailed.

Regional conflict was most pronounced over the issue of slavery. One example of a provision repeatedly supported by the House but blocked by the Senate was the Wilmot Proviso, which sought to ban slavery in the land gained during the Mexican–American War. Conflict over slavery and other issues persisted until the Civil War (1861–1865), which began soon after several southern states attempted to secede from the Union. The Civil War culminated in the South's defeat and in the abolition of slavery. Since all southern senators except Andrew Johnson resigned their seats at the beginning of the war, the Senate did not hold the balance of power between North and South during the war.

During the Reconstruction that followed, the Republican Party held large majorities, which many Americans associated with the Union's victory in the Civil War and the ending of slavery. The Reconstruction period ended in about 1877. The ensuing era, known as the Gilded Age, was marked by sharp political divisions in the electorate. The Democratic Party and Republican Party each held majorities in the House at various times.

The late 19th and early 20th centuries also saw a dramatic increase in the power of the speaker of the House. The rise of the speaker's influence began in the 1890s, during the tenure of Republican Thomas Brackett Reed. "Czar Reed", as he was nicknamed, attempted to put into effect his view that "[t]he best system is to have one party govern and the other party watch." The leadership structure of the House also developed during approximately the same period, with the positions of majority leader and minority leader being created in 1899. While the minority leader was the head of the minority party, the majority leader remained subordinate to the speaker.

=== 20th century ===
The speakership reached its zenith during the term of Republican Joseph Gurney Cannon, from 1903 to 1911. The speaker's powers included chairmanship of the influential Rules Committee and the ability to appoint members of other House committees. This influence was curtailed in the "Revolution of 1910", a set of reforms enacted by Democrats and dissatisfied Republicans who opposed Speaker Cannon's heavy-handed tactics. This influence was restored to an extent in the 1970s to take power away from committees.

The Democratic Party dominated the House of Representatives during the Franklin D. Roosevelt administration between 1933 and 1945, often winning over two-thirds of the seats. Both Democrats and Republicans were in power at times during the next decade. The Democratic Party maintained control of the House from 1955 until 1995. In the mid-1970s, members passed major reforms that strengthened the power of subcommittees at the expense of committee chairs, and allowed party leaders to nominate committee chairs. These actions were taken to undermine the seniority system, and to reduce the ability of a small number of senior members to obstruct legislation they did not favor. There was a shift from the 1990s to greater control of the legislative program by the majority party. The power of party leaders, especially the speaker, grew considerably.

According to historian Julian E. Zelizer, the majority Democrats minimized the number of staff positions available to the minority Republicans, kept them out of decision-making, and gerrymandered their home districts. Republican Newt Gingrich argued that American democracy was being ruined by the Democrats' tactics and that the GOP had to destroy the system before it could be saved. Cooperation in governance, says Zelizer, would have to be put aside until they deposed Speaker Wright and regained power.

Gingrich brought an ethics complaint which led to Wright's resignation in 1989. Gingrich gained support from the media and good government forces in his crusade to persuade Americans that the system was, in Gingrich's words, "morally, intellectually and spiritually corrupt". Gingrich followed Wright's successor, Democrat Tom Foley, as speaker after the Republican Revolution of 1994 gave his party control of the House.

Gingrich attempted to pass a major legislative program, the Contract with America, and made major reforms of the House, notably reducing the tenure of committee chairs to three two-year terms. Many elements of the Contract did not pass Congress, were vetoed by President Bill Clinton, or were substantially altered in negotiations with Clinton. After Republicans held control in the 1996 election, however, Clinton and the Gingrich-led House agreed on the first balanced federal budget in decades, along with a substantial tax cut.

=== 21st century ===
Republicans controlled the House of Representatives until the 2006 elections, when the Democrats won control and Nancy Pelosi was elected by the House as the first female speaker.

Republicans regained control of the House of Representatives in 2010 elections with the largest shift of political power between the parties since the 1938 elections. Republicans held the House until Democrats retook it in the 2018 elections, which became the best midterm performance for the Democrats since 1974. In the 2022 elections, Republicans took back control of the House, winning a slim majority.

Following the election of transgender representative Sarah McBride in November 2024, House speaker Mike Johnson announced that restrooms in the House would be restricted based on "biological sex", i.e. sex assignment at birth. The announcement was criticized as transphobic bullying. McBride announced she would comply with the rule but called it an "effort to distract from the real issues facing this country".

== Membership, qualifications, and apportionment ==
=== Apportionments ===
Under Article I, Section 2 of the Constitution, seats in the House of Representatives are apportioned among the states by population, as determined by the census conducted every ten years. Each state is entitled to at least one representative, however small its population.

The only constitutional rule relating to the size of the House states: "The Number of Representatives shall not exceed one for every thirty Thousand, but each State shall have at Least one Representative." Congress regularly increased the size of the House to account for population growth until it fixed the number of voting House members at 435 in 1911. Upon the admission of Alaska and Hawaii, the number was temporarily increased to 437, as one representative from each of those states was seated with no change in existing apportionment. In 1963, the number returned to 435, after the reapportionment consequent to the 1960 census. As of the reapportionment based on the 2020 United States census, each district represents an average of 761,169 people.

The Constitution does not provide for the representation of the District of Columbia or of territories. The District of Columbia and the territories of Puerto Rico, American Samoa, Guam, the Northern Mariana Islands, and the U.S. Virgin Islands are each represented by one non-voting delegate. Puerto Rico elects a resident commissioner, but other than having a four-year term, the resident commissioner's role is identical to the delegates from the other territories. The five delegates and resident commissioner may participate in debates. Before 2011, they were also allowed to vote in committees and the Committee of the Whole when their votes would not be decisive.

=== Redistricting ===
States entitled to more than one representative are divided into single-member districts. This has been a federal statutory requirement since 1967 pursuant to the Uniform Congressional District Act. Before that law, general ticket representation was used by some states.

States typically redraw district boundaries after each census, though they may do so at other times, such as the 2003 Texas redistricting. Each state determines its own district boundaries, either through legislation or through non-partisan panels. Malapportionment is unconstitutional and districts must be approximately equal in population (see Wesberry v. Sanders). Section 2 of the Voting Rights Act of 1965 prohibits redistricting plans that are intended to, or have the effect of, discriminating against racial or language minority voters.

While malapportionment and discrimination against racial- or language minorities are illegal, federal courts have allowed state legislatures to engage in gerrymandering to benefit political parties or incumbents. In a 1984 case, Davis v. Bandemer, the Supreme Court held that districts gerrymandered for partisan ends could be struck down based on the Equal Protection Clause, but the Court did not articulate a standard for impermissible partisan gerrymandering. In 2004, the Court ruled in Vieth v. Jubelirer that due to the lack of standards for adjudicating claims of partisan gerrymandering, such claims were nonjusticiable, effectively overruling Davis. In 2019, the Court held in Rucho v. Common Cause that partisan gerrymandering claims are per se nonjusticiable and present political questions rather than legal ones.

In 2015, according to calculations made by Burt Neuborne using criteria set forth by the American Political Science Association, about 40 seats (about 9% of the total) were chosen through a genuinely contested electoral process, fewer than how many would be without partisan gerrymandering.

=== Qualifications ===
Article I, Section 2 of the Constitution sets three qualifications for representatives. Each representative must: (1) be at least twenty-five (25) years old; (2) have been a citizen of the United States for the past seven years; and (3) be (at the time of the election) an inhabitant of the state they represent. Members are not required to live in the districts they represent, but they traditionally do. The age and citizenship qualifications for representatives are less than those for senators.

The constitutional requirements of Article I, Section 2 for election to Congress are the maximum requirements that can be imposed on a candidate. Therefore, Article I, Section 5, which permits each house of Congress to be the judge of the qualifications of its own members, does not permit additional qualifications. Likewise, a state could not establish additional qualifications. William C. C. Claiborne served in the House below the minimum age of 25.

Under section 3 of the Fourteenth Amendment, a federal or state officer who takes the requisite oath to support the Constitution, but later engages in rebellion or aids the enemies of the United States, is disqualified from becoming a representative, unless two-thirds of each house of Congress votes to remove this disqualification. This post–Civil War provision was intended to prevent those who sided with the Confederacy from serving, but a blanket amnesty was granted in 1872 to most Confederates, followed by a total amnesty in 1898.

=== Elections ===
Population per U.S. representative allocated to each of the 50 states and D.C., ranked by population. Since D.C. (ranked 49th) receives no voting seats in the House, its bar is absent.

U.S. congressional districts for the 115th Congress, 2017–2019

Elections for representatives are held in every even-numbered year, on Election Day, the first Tuesday after the first Monday in November. Pursuant to the Uniform Congressional District Act, representatives must be elected from single-member districts. After a census is taken (in a year ending in 0), the first year ending in 2 is the first year in which elections for U.S. House districts are based on that census. The Congress based on those districts starts its term on the following January 3.

As there is no legislation at the federal level mandating one particular system for elections to the House, systems are set at the state level. As of 2022, first-past-the-post or plurality voting is used in 46 states, electing 412 representatives. Ranked-choice or instant-runoff voting is in two states, Alaska and Maine, electing 3 representatives. Two-round system are in two states, Georgia and Louisiana, electing 20 representatives. Elected representatives serve a two-year term, with no term limit.

In most states, major party candidates for each district are nominated in partisan primary elections, typically held in spring to late summer. In some states, the Republican and Democratic parties choose their candidates for each district in their political conventions in spring or early summer, which often use unanimous voice votes to reflect either confidence in the incumbent or the result of bargaining in earlier private discussions. Exceptions can result in so-called floor fights—convention votes by delegates, with outcomes that can be hard to predict.

Especially if a convention is closely divided, a losing candidate may contend further by meeting the conditions for a primary election. The courts generally do not consider ballot access rules for independent and third party candidates to be additional qualifications for holding office and no federal statutes regulate ballot access. As a result, the process to gain ballot access varies greatly from state to state, and may depend on a party's performance in previous years' elections; this typically only affects third parties.

In 1967, Congress passed the Uniform Congressional District Act, which requires all representatives to be elected from single-member-districts. Following the Wesberry v. Sanders decision, Congress was motivated by fears that courts would impose at-large plurality districts on states that did not redistrict to comply with the new mandates for districts roughly equal in population. Congress also sought to prevent attempts by southern states to use such voting systems to dilute the vote of racial minorities.

Several states have used multi-member districts in the past, although only two states (Hawaii and New Mexico) used multi-member districts in 1967. Louisiana is unique in that it holds a jungle primary election on the general Election Day with a subsequent runoff election between the top two finishers, regardless of party, if no candidate received a majority in the primary. The states of Washington and California use a similar, though not identical system to that used by Louisiana.

Seats vacated during a term are filled through special elections, unless the vacancy occurs closer to the next general election date than a pre-established deadline. Article I, Section 2 of the Constitution states that when vacancies occur, the executive—the governor of the state with the vacancy—can issue a writ of election to fill the vacancy.

=== Non-voting delegates ===
Historically, many territories have sent non-voting delegates to the House. While their role has fluctuated over the years, today they have many of the same privileges as voting members, have a voice in committees, and can introduce bills on the floor, but cannot vote on the ultimate passage of bills. The District of Columbia and the five inhabited U.S. territories each elect a delegate. A seventh delegate, representing the Cherokee Nation, has been formally proposed but has not yet been seated. An eighth delegate, representing the Choctaw Nation, is guaranteed by treaty but has not yet been proposed.

Some territories choose to also hold elections for shadow representatives. Elected shadow representatives are not members of the House and are separate individuals from their polities' official non-voting delegates.

=== Terms ===
Representatives and delegates serve for two-year terms. A resident commissioner, a kind of delegate, serves for four years. A term starts on January 3 following the election in November. The U.S. Constitution requires that vacancies in the House be filled with a special election. The term of the replacement member expires on the date that the original member's would have expired.

The Constitution permits the House to expel a member with a two-thirds vote. In the history of the United States, only six members have been expelled from the House. In 1861, three were removed for supporting the Confederate states' secession: Democrats John Bullock Clark of Missouri, John William Reid of Missouri, and Henry Cornelius Burnett of Kentucky. In 1980, Democrat Michael Myers of Pennsylvania was expelled after his criminal conviction for accepting bribes. In 2002, Democrat James Traficant of Ohio was expelled following his conviction for corruption. In 2023, Republican George Santos was expelled after he was implicated in fraud by both a federal indictment and a House Ethics Committee investigation.

The House also has the power to formally censure or reprimand its members. Censure or reprimand of a member requires only a simple majority, and does not remove that member from office. As of November 2021, 24 members have been censured.

== Comparison to the Senate ==
As a check on the regional, popular, and rapidly changing politics of the House, the Senate has several distinct powers. For example, the "advice and consent" powers, such as the power to approve treaties and confirm members of the Cabinet, are a sole Senate privilege.

The House has the exclusive power to initiate bills for raising revenue, to impeach officials, and to choose the president if a presidential candidate fails to get a majority of the Electoral College votes.

The Senate and House are further differentiated by term lengths and the number of districts represented: the Senate has longer terms of six years, fewer members (currently one hundred, with two for each state), and larger constituencies per member in all but six delegations (those states with only one representative).

== Salary and benefits ==
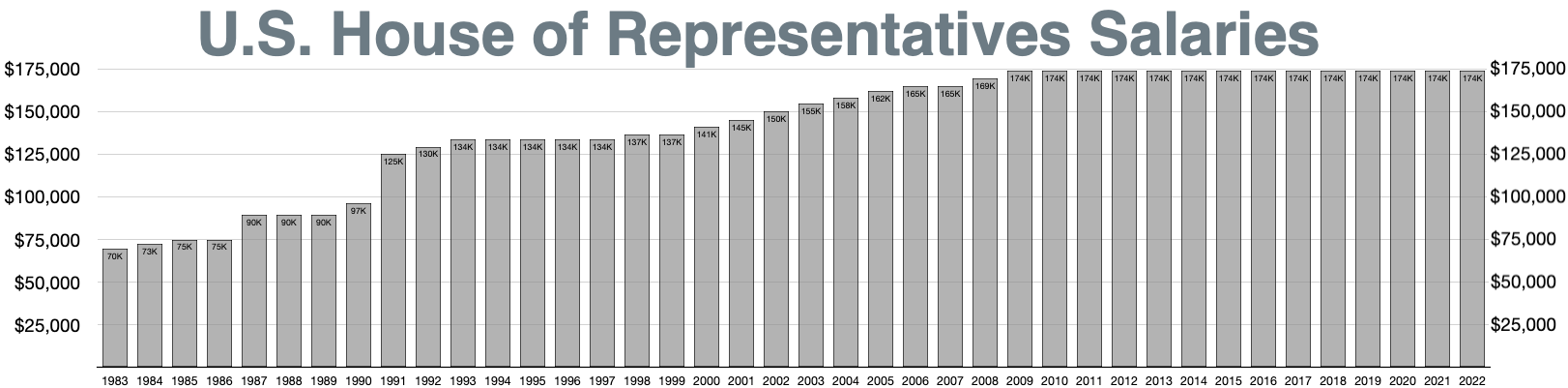
House of Representatives salaries, 1983 to 2022

=== Salaries ===
Since December 2014, the annual salary of each representative is $174,000, the same as it is for each member of the Senate. The speaker of the House and the majority and minority leaders earn more: $223,500 for the speaker and $193,400 for their party leaders, the same as Senate leaders. A cost-of-living-adjustment (COLA) increase takes effect annually unless Congress votes not to accept it.

Congress sets members' salaries, but the Twenty-seventh Amendment to the United States Constitution prohibits changes in salary (excluding COLA) from taking effect until after the next election of the whole House. Representatives are eligible for retirement benefits after serving for five years. Outside pay is limited to 15% of congressional pay, and certain types of income involving a fiduciary responsibility or personal endorsement are prohibited. Salaries are not for life, only during active term.

=== Titles ===
Representatives use the prefix "The Honorable" before their names. A member of the House is referred to as a representative, congressman, or congresswoman. Congressman can refer to a person in the Senate or House of Representatives, and Congresswoman is an informal title. According to Daniel Wirlis, a professor at the University of California, Santa Cruz, Representative is the official title for someone in the House of Representatives. "Member of congress" can be abbreviated as "MC".

Representatives are usually identified in the media and other sources by party and state, and sometimes by congressional district, or a major city or community within their district. For example, Democratic representative Nancy Pelosi, who represents California's 11th congressional district within San Francisco, may be identified as "D–California", "D–California–11" or "D–San Francisco".

=== Pension ===
All members of Congress are automatically enrolled in the Federal Employees Retirement System, a pension system also used for federal civil servants, except the formula for calculating Congress members' pension results in a 70% higher pension than other federal employees based on the first 20 years of service. They become eligible to receive benefits after five years of service (two and one-half terms in the House). The FERS is composed of three elements:

1. Social Security
2. The FERS basic annuity, a monthly pension plan based on the number of years of service and the average of the three highest years of basic pay (70% higher pension than other federal employees based on the first 20 years of service)
3. The Thrift Savings Plan, a 401(k)-like defined contribution plan for retirement account into which participants can deposit up to a maximum of $19,000 in 2019. Their employing agency matches employee contributions up to 5% of pay.

Members of Congress may retire with full benefits at age 62 after five years of service, at age 50 after 20 years of service, and at any age after 25 years of service. With an average age of 58 as of 2023, the U.S. House of Representatives is older than comparable chambers in the other G7 nations.

=== Tax deductions ===
Members of Congress are permitted to deduct up to $3,000 of living expenses per year incurred while living away from their district or home state.

=== Health benefits ===
Before 2014, members of Congress and their staff had access to essentially the same health benefits as federal civil servants; they could voluntarily enroll in the Federal Employees Health Benefits Program (FEHBP), an employer-sponsored health insurance program, and were eligible to participate in other programs, such as the Federal Flexible Spending Account Program (FSAFEDS).

Effective January 1, 2014, Section 1312(d)(3)(D) of the Patient Protection and Affordable Care Act (ACA) provided that the only health plans that the federal government can make available to members of Congress and certain congressional staff are those created under the ACA or offered through a health care exchange. The Office of Personnel Management promulgated a final rule to comply with Section 1312(d)(3)(D). Under the rule, members and designated staff are generally no longer able to purchase FEHBP plans as active employees; however, if members enroll in a health plan offered through a Small Business Health Options Program (SHOP) exchange, they remain eligible for an employer contribution toward coverage, and members and designated staff eligible for retirement may enroll in a FEHBP plan upon retirement.

The ACA and the final rule do not affect members' or staffers' eligibility for Medicare benefits. The ACA and the final rule also do not affect members' and staffers' eligibility for other health benefits related to federal employment, so members and staff are eligible to participate in FSAFEDS (which has three options within the program), the Federal Employees Dental and Vision Insurance Program, and the Federal Long Term Care Insurance Program.

The Office of the Attending Physician at the U.S. Capitol provides members with health care for an annual fee of $650. The attending physician provides routine exams, consultations, and certain diagnostics, and may write prescriptions, although the office does not dispense them. The office does not provide vision or dental care.

Members, but not their dependents, and not former members, may receive medical and emergency dental care at military treatment facilities. There is no charge for outpatient care if it is provided in the National Capital Region, but members are billed at full reimbursement rates, set by the Department of Defense, for inpatient care. Outside the National Capital Region, charges are at full reimbursement rates for both inpatient and outpatient care.

=== Personnel, mail and office expenses ===
House members are eligible for a Member's Representational Allowance (MRA) to support them in their official and representational duties to their district. The MRA is calculated based on three components: one for personnel, one for official office expenses and one for official or franked mail. The personnel allowance is the same for all members. The office and mail allowances vary based on the members' district's distance from Washington, D.C., the cost of office space in the member's district, and the number of non-business addresses in their district.

These three components are used to calculate a single MRA that can fund any expense—even though each component is calculated individually, the franking allowance can be used to pay for personnel expenses if the member so chooses. In 2011 this allowance averaged $1.4 million per member, and ranged from $1.35 to $1.67 million. The personnel allowance was $944,671 per member in 2010. Each member may employ no more than 18 permanent employees. Members' employees' salary is capped at $168,411 as of 2009.

=== Travel allowance ===
Before being sworn into office, each member-elect and one staffer can be paid for one round trip between their home in their congressional district and Washington, D.C., for organization caucuses. Members are allowed "a sum for travel based on the following formula: 64 times the rate per mile ... multiplied by the mileage between Washington, DC, and the furthest point in a Member's district, plus 10%." As of January 2012, the rate ranges from $0.41 to $1.32 per mile ($0.25 to $0.82/km) based on distance ranges between D.C. and the member's district.

== Officers ==
=== Member officials ===
The party with a majority of seats in the House is known as the majority party. The next-largest party is the minority party. The speaker, committee chairs, and some other officials are generally from the majority party; they have counterparts (for instance, the "ranking members" of committees) in the minority party.

The Constitution provides that the House may choose its own speaker. Although not explicitly required by the Constitution, every speaker has been a member of the House. The Constitution does not specify the duties and powers of the speaker, which are instead regulated by the rules and customs of the House. Speakers have a role both as a leader of the House and the leader of their party (which need not be the majority party; theoretically, a member of the minority party could be elected as speaker with the support of a fraction of members of the majority party). Under the Presidential Succession Act (1947), the speaker is second in the line of presidential succession after the vice president.

The speaker is the presiding officer of the House, but does not preside over every debate. Instead, they delegate the responsibility of presiding to other members in most cases. The presiding officer sits in a chair in the front of the House chamber. The powers of the presiding officer are extensive. One important power is that of controlling the order in which members of the House speak: no member may make a speech or a motion unless they have first been recognized by the presiding officer. Also, the presiding officer rules on points of order – a member's objection that a rule has been breached – but these decisions are subject to appeal to the whole House.

Speakers serve as chairs of their party's steering committee, which is responsible for assigning party members to other House committees. The speaker chooses the chairs of standing committees, appoints most of the members of the Rules Committee, appoints all members of conference committees, and determines which committees consider bills.

Each party elects a floor leader, who is known as the majority leader or minority leader. The minority leader heads their party in the House, and the majority leader is their party's second-highest-ranking official in the House of Representatives, behind the speaker.

After the floor leaders, the next ranking official in the House party's leadership is the whip, who works to ensure that the party's members vote as the party leadership desires.

After the whips, the next ranking official in the House party's leadership is the party caucus chair, styled as the "Republican conference chair" for the Republican Party and the "Democratic caucus chair" for the Democratic Party.

After the party conference chair, there are differences between each party's subsequent leadership ranks. After the Democratic caucus chair is the chair of the Democratic Congressional Campaign Committee, then the co-chairs of the Steering Committee. After the Republican conference chair is the chair of the House Republican Policy Committee, followed by the chair of the National Republican Congressional Committee, the House campaign committee for the Republican Party.

The chairs of House committees, particularly influential standing committees such as Appropriations, Ways and Means, and Rules, are powerful but not officially part of the House leadership hierarchy. Until the post of majority leader was created, the chair of Ways and Means or Appropriations Committees was the de facto majority leader.

==== Leadership and partisanship ====
When the presidency and Senate are controlled by a different party from the one controlling the House, the speaker can become the de facto "leader of the opposition". Some notable examples include Tip O'Neill in the 1980s, Newt Gingrich in the 1990s, John Boehner in the early 2010s, and Nancy Pelosi in the late 2000s and again in the late 2010s and early 2020s. Since the speaker is a partisan officer with substantial power to control the business of the House, the position is often used for partisan advantage.

In the instance when the presidency and both Houses of Congress are controlled by one party, the speaker normally takes a low profile and defers to the president. For that situation the House minority leader can play the role of a de facto "leader of the opposition", often more so than the Senate minority leader, due to the more partisan nature of the House and the greater role of leadership.

=== Non-member officials ===
The House is also served by several officials who are not members. The House's chief such officer is the clerk, who maintains public records and prepares documents. The clerk also presides over the House at the beginning of each new Congress pending the election of a speaker. The clerk oversaw pages until the discontinuation of the program in 2011.

Another officer is the chief administrative officer, responsible for the day-to-day administrative support to the House of Representatives. This includes everything from payroll to food service. The position of chief administrative officer (CAO) was created by the 104th Congress following the 1994 midterm elections, replacing the positions of doorkeeper and director of non-legislative and financial services. The CAO also assumed some of the responsibilities of the House Information Services, which previously had been controlled directly by the Committee on House Administration, then headed by Representative Charlie Rose of North Carolina, along with the House "Folding Room".

The chaplain leads the House in prayer at the opening of the day. The sergeant at arms is the House's chief law enforcement officer and maintains order and security on House premises, but routine police work is handled by the United States Capitol Police, which is supervised by the Capitol Police Board. The House Sergeant at Arms is a member of the Board and serves as its chair in even-numbered years (the Senate Sergeant at Arms serves as its chair in odd-numbered years).

== Procedure ==
=== Daily procedures ===
Like the Senate, the House of Representatives meets in the United States Capitol in Washington, D.C. At one end of the chamber of the House is a rostrum from which the speaker, Speaker pro tempore, or (when in Committee of the Whole House) the chair presides. The lower tiers of the rostrum are used by clerks and other officials. A table in front of the rostrum is used by the official reporters. Members' seats are arranged in the chamber in a semicircular pattern facing the rostrum and are divided by a wide central aisle.

By tradition, Democrats sit on the left of the center aisle. Republicans sit on the right, facing the presiding officer's chair. Sittings are normally held on weekdays. Meetings on Saturdays and Sundays are rare. Sittings of the House are generally open to the public. Visitors must obtain a House Gallery pass from a congressional office. Sittings are broadcast live on television and have been streamed live on C-SPAN since March 1979, and on HouseLive, the official streaming service operated by the Clerk, since 2010.

The procedure of the House depends on the rules, and a variety of customs, precedents, and traditions. In many cases, the House waives some of its stricter rules, including time limits on debates, by unanimous consent. A member may block a unanimous consent agreement, but objections are rare. The presiding officer, the speaker of the House enforces the rules of the House, and may warn members who deviate from them. The speaker uses a gavel to maintain order. Legislation to be considered by the House is placed in a box called the hopper.

In one of its first resolutions, the U.S. House of Representatives established the Office of the Sergeant at Arms. In an American tradition adopted from English custom in 1789 by the first speaker of the House, Frederick Muhlenberg of Pennsylvania, the Mace of the United States House of Representatives is used to open all sessions of the House. It is also used during the inaugural ceremonies for all presidents of the United States. For daily sessions of the House, the sergeant at arms carries the mace ahead of the speaker in procession to the rostrum. It is placed on a green marble pedestal to the speaker's right. When the House is in committee, the mace is moved to a pedestal next to the desk of the Sergeant at Arms.

The Constitution provides that a majority of the House constitutes a quorum to do business. Under the rules and customs of the House, a quorum is always assumed present unless a quorum call explicitly demonstrates otherwise. House rules prevent a member from making a point of order that a quorum is not present unless a question is being voted on. The presiding officer does not accept a point of order of no quorum during general debate, or when a question is not before the House.

During debates, a member may speak only if called upon by the presiding officer. The presiding officer decides which members to recognize, and can therefore control the course of debate. All speeches must be addressed to the presiding officer, using the words "Mr. Speaker" or "Madam Speaker". Only the presiding officer may be directly addressed in speeches. Other members must be referred to in the third person. In most cases, members do not refer to each other only by name, but also by state, using forms such as "the gentleman from Virginia", "the distinguished gentlewoman from California", or "my distinguished friend from Alabama".

There are 448 permanent seats on the House Floor and four tables, two on each side. These tables are occupied by members of the committee that have brought a bill to the floor for consideration and by the party leadership. Members address the House from microphones at any table or "the well", the area immediately in front of the rostrum.

=== Passage of legislation ===
Under the U.S. Constitution, the House of Representatives determines the rules according to which it passes legislation. Any of the rules can be changed with each new Congress, but in practice each new session amends a standing set of rules built up over the history of the body in an early resolution published for public inspection. Before legislation reaches the floor of the House, the Rules Committee normally passes a rule to govern debate on that measure, which then must be passed by the full House before it becomes effective.

For instance, the committee determines if amendments to the bill are permitted. An "open rule" permits all germane amendments, but a "closed rule" restricts or even prohibits amendment. Debate on a bill is generally restricted to one hour, equally divided between the majority and minority parties. Each side is led during the debate by a "floor manager", who allocates debate time to members who wish to speak. On contentious matters, many members may wish to speak; thus, a member may receive as little as one minute, or even thirty seconds, to make their point.

When debate concludes, the motion is put to a vote. In many cases, the House votes by voice vote; the presiding officer puts the question, and members respond either "yea!" or "aye!" (in favor of the motion) or "nay!" or "no!" (against the motion). The presiding officer then announces the result of the voice vote. A member may challenge the presiding officer's assessment and "request the yeas and nays" or "request a recorded vote". The request may be granted only if it is seconded by one-fifth of the members present. Traditionally, members of Congress second requests for recorded votes as a matter of courtesy. Some votes are always recorded, such as those on the annual budget.

A recorded vote may be taken in one of three different ways. One is electronically. Members use a personal identification card to record their votes at 46 voting stations in the chamber. Votes are usually held in this way. A second mode of recorded vote is by teller. Members hand in colored cards to indicate their votes: green for "yea", red for "nay", and orange for "present", i.e., to abstain.

Teller votes are normally held only when electronic voting breaks down. The House may conduct a roll call vote. The Clerk reads the list of members of the House, each of whom announces their vote when their name is called. This procedure is only used rarely, and usually for ceremonial occasions, such as for the election of a speaker, because of the time consumed by calling over four hundred names.

Voting traditionally lasts for, at most, fifteen minutes, but it may be extended if the leadership needs to "whip" more members into alignment. The 2003 vote on the prescription drug benefit was open for three hours, from 3:00 to 6:00 a.m., to receive four additional votes, three of which were necessary to pass the legislation. The 2005 vote on the Central American Free Trade Agreement was open for one hour, from 11:00 p.m. to midnight. An October 2005 vote on facilitating refinery construction was kept open for forty minutes.

Presiding officers may vote like other members. They may not vote twice in the event of a tie. A tie vote defeats the motion.

== Committees and caucuses ==
=== Committees ===
The House uses committees and their subcommittees for a variety of purposes, including the review of bills and the oversight of the executive branch. The appointment of committee members is formally made by the whole House, but the choice of members is actually made by the political parties. Generally, each party honors the preferences of individual members, giving priority on the basis of seniority. Historically, membership on committees has been in rough proportion to the party's strength in the House, with two exceptions: on the Rules Committee, the majority party fills nine of the thirteen seats; and on the Ethics Committee, each party has an equal number of seats.

When party control in the House is closely divided, extra seats on committees are sometimes allocated to the majority party. In the 109th Congress, for example, the Republicans controlled about 53% of the House, but had 54% of the Appropriations Committee members, 55% of the members on the Energy and Commerce Committee, and 58% of the members on the Judiciary Committee.

The largest committee of the House is the Committee of the Whole, which, as its name suggests, consists of all members of the House. The Committee meets in the House chamber. It may consider and amend bills, but may not grant them final passage. Generally, the debate procedures of the Committee of the Whole are more flexible than those of the House itself. One advantage of the Committee of the Whole, is its ability to include otherwise non-voting members of Congress.

Most committee work is performed by twenty standing committees, each of which has jurisdiction over a specific set of issues, such as Agriculture or Foreign Affairs. Each standing committee considers, amends, and reports bills that fall under its jurisdiction. Committees have extensive powers with regard to bills; they may block legislation from reaching the floor of the House. Standing committees also oversee the departments and agencies of the executive branch. In discharging their duties, standing committees have the power to hold hearings and to subpoena witnesses and evidence.

The House has one permanent committee that is not a standing committee, the Permanent Select Committee on Intelligence. The House may occasionally establish temporary or advisory committees, such as the Select Committee on Energy Independence and Global Warming. This latter committee, created in the 110th Congress and reauthorized for the 111th, had no jurisdiction over legislation and such committees must be chartered anew at the start of every Congress.

The House also appoints members to serve on joint committees, which include members of the Senate and House. Some joint committees oversee independent government bodies; for instance, the Joint Committee on the Library oversees the Library of Congress. Other joint committees serve to make advisory reports; for example, there exists a Joint Committee on Taxation. Bills and nominees are not referred to joint committees. Hence, the power of joint committees is considerably lower than those of standing committees.

Each House committee and subcommittee is led by a chairman, always a member of the majority party. From 1910 to the 1970s, committee chairs were powerful. Woodrow Wilson in his classic study, suggested:

Power is nowhere concentrated; it is rather deliberately and of set policy scattered amongst many small chiefs. It is divided up, as it were, into forty-seven seigniories, in each of which a Standing Committee is the court-baron and its chairman lord-proprietor. These petty barons, some of them not a little powerful, but none of them within the reach of the full powers of rule, may at will exercise almost despotic sway within their own shires, and may sometimes threaten to convulse even the realm itself.

From 1910 to 1975, committee and subcommittee chairmanship was determined purely by seniority. Members of Congress sometimes had to wait 30 years to get one, but their chairship was independent of party leadership. In 1975, the rules were changed to permit party caucuses to elect chairs, shifting power upward to the party leaders. In 1995, Republicans under Newt Gingrich set a limit of three two-year terms for committee chairs. The chair's powers are extensive. They control the committee/subcommittee agenda, and may prevent the committee from dealing with a bill. The senior member of the minority party is known as the Ranking Member. In some committees like Appropriations, partisan disputes are few.

=== Caucuses ===
US House of Representatives Caucuses 2025 Democratic Caucus (214) Congressional Progressive Caucus: 64 seats NDC and CPC: 30 seats New Democrat Coalition: 77 seats BDC and NDC: 6 seats Blue Dog Coalition: 4 seats Other Democrats: 31 seats Vacant (2) Vacant (2) Republican Conference (219) Other Republicans: 2 seats Republican Governance Group: 21 seats RGG and RSC: 25 seats (Note: The Republican Study Committee no longer publishes a detailed member roster and the actual count may therefore be higher.) Republican Study Committee: 138 seats RSC and Freedom Caucus: 25 seats (Note: The Freedom caucus does not publish its member roster and the actual count may therefore be higher.) Freedom Caucus: 9 seats

Ideological congressional caucuses represent factions within a political party. These congressional caucuses help congregate and advance the ideals of more focused ideologies within the two major big-tent political parties. Some caucuses are organized political factions with a common ideological orientation. Most ideological caucuses are confined to the House of Representatives. The rosters of large caucuses are usually listed publicly. Members of Congress are not restricted to a single ideological caucus, creating overlaps between the organizations. Some ideological caucuses exercise influence akin to that of whips.

== Legislative functions ==
Most bills may be introduced in either House of Congress. However, the Constitution states

All Bills for raising Revenue shall originate in the House of Representatives[...].

Called the Origination Clause, this provision means the Senate cannot initiate bills imposing taxes. This provision barring the Senate from introducing revenue bills is based on the practice of the British Parliament, in which only the House of Commons may originate such measures. Congressional tradition holds that the House of Representatives originates appropriation bills.

Although it cannot originate revenue bills, the Senate retains the power to amend or reject them. Woodrow Wilson wrote the following about appropriations bills:

[T]he constitutional prerogative of the House has been held to apply to all the general appropriations bills, and the Senate's right to amend these has been allowed the widest possible scope. The upper house may add to them what it pleases; may go altogether outside of their original provisions and tack to them entirely new features of legislation, altering not only the amounts but even the objects of expenditure, and making out of the materials sent them by the popular chamber measures of an almost totally new character.

The approval of the Senate and the House of Representatives is required for a bill to become law. Both Houses must pass the same version of the bill. If there are differences, they may be resolved by a conference committee, which includes members of both bodies.

The president may veto a bill passed by the House and Senate. If they do, the bill does not become law unless each House, by a two-thirds vote, votes to override the veto. The House and Senate cannot override a pocket veto.

== Checks and balances ==
The Constitution provides that the Senate's "advice and consent" is necessary for the president to make appointments and to ratify treaties.

The Constitution empowers the House of Representatives to impeach federal officials for "Treason, Bribery, or other high Crimes and Misdemeanors" and empowers the Senate to try such impeachments. The House may approve "articles of impeachment" by a simple majority vote. A two-thirds vote is required for conviction in the Senate. A convicted official is automatically removed from office and may be disqualified from holding future office under the United States. No further punishment is permitted during the impeachment proceedings; however, the party may face criminal penalties in a normal court of law.

In U.S. history, the House of Representatives has impeached seventeen officials, seven of whom were convicted. Another, Richard Nixon, resigned after the House Judiciary Committee passed articles of impeachment but before a formal impeachment vote by the full House. Only three U.S. presidents have ever been impeached: Andrew Johnson in 1868, Bill Clinton in 1998, and Donald Trump in 2019 and in 2021. The trials of Johnson, Clinton, and Trump all ended in acquittal. In Johnson's case, the Senate fell one vote short of the two-thirds majority required for conviction.

Under the Twelfth Amendment, the House has the power to elect the president if no presidential candidate receives a majority of votes in the Electoral College. The Twelfth Amendment requires the House to choose from the three candidates with the highest numbers of electoral votes. The Constitution provides that "the votes shall be taken by states, the representation from each state having one vote".

It is rare for no presidential candidate to receive a majority of electoral votes. In U.S. history, the House has only had to choose a president twice. In the 1800 election, which was held before adoption of the Twelfth Amendment, it elected Thomas Jefferson over Aaron Burr. In the 1824 election, it elected John Quincy Adams over Andrew Jackson and William H. Crawford. If no vice presidential candidate receives a majority of the electoral votes, the Senate elects the vice president from the two candidates with the highest numbers of electoral votes.

Before the Twenty-fifth Amendment was adopted in 1967, if the office of the vice president became prematurely vacant, it was left vacant until the next inauguration. Since then, both House and Senate confirmation is required to fill a vacancy if the vice presidency is vacant.

== Historical composition ==
This chart shows the historical composition of the United States House of Representatives, from the 1st Congress to the present day.

United States House of Representatives, 1789 to present

AA / DR / Dem. / Soc. / Anti-Mas. / Null. / SR / Ind. / Opp. / Un. / LO / Cons. / PA / Fed. / Lab. / GB / Pop. / Prg. '12 / Prg. '24 / FL / FS / Sil. / S.Rep. / NR / Whig / Anti-Neb. / LR / Readj. / NU / Rep. / Peo. / KN / RU / Proh.			Total
1st	1788	28 / 37	65
2nd	1790	30 / 39	67
3rd	1792	54 / 51	105
4th	1794	59 / 47	106
5th	1796	49 / 57	106
6th	1798	46 / 60	106
7th	1800	68 / 38	106
8th	1802	102 / 40	142
9th	1804	114 / 28	142
10th	1806	116 / 26	142
11th	1808	94 / 48	142
12th	1810	106 / 36	142
13th	1812	114 / 68	182
14th	1814	118 / 64	182
15th	1816	144 / 40	184
16th	1818	158 / 28	186
17th	1820	155 / 32	187
18th	1822	189 / 24	213
19th	1824	104 / 108	213
20th	1826	113 / 100	213
21st	1828	136 / 5 / 72	213
22nd	1830	4 / 126 / 17 / 66	213
23rd	1832	9 / 143 / 25 / 63	240
24th	1834	8 / 142 / 16 / 75	241
25th	1836	6 / 128 / 1 / 7 / 100	242
26th	1838	125 / 2 / 6 / 109	242
27th	1840	99 / 2 / 142	242
28th	1842	148 / 2 / 2 / 73	223
29th	1844	142 / 79 / 6	224
30th	1846	110 / 1 / 116 / 1	228
31st	1848	113 / 1 / 9 / 108 / 1	233
32nd	1850	3 / 127 / 10 / 4 / 4 / 85	233
33rd	1852	4 / 150 / 5 / 3 / 4 / 68	234
34th	1854	83 / 1 / 1 / 54 / 22 / 13 / 9 / 51	234
35th	1856	132 / 1 / 90 / 14	237
36th	1858	83 / 1 / 19 / 113 / 9	238
37th	1860	1 / 44 / 1 / 31 / 106	183
38th	1862	72 / 25 / 87	184
39th	1864	5 / 33 / 1 / 150 / 4	193
40th	1866	2 / 47 / 2 / 173	224
41st	1868	5 / 67 / 171	243
42nd	1870	10 / 94 / 1 / 2 / 136	243
43rd	1872	4 / 84 / 1 / 4 / 199	292
44th	1874	182 / 8 / 103	292
45th	1876	155 / 2 / 136	293
46th	1878	141 / 13 / 7 / 132	293
47th	1880	128 / 10 / 2 / 2 / 151	293
48th	1882	196 / 2 / 6 / 4 / 117	325
49th	1884	182 / 1 / 1 / 141	325
50th	1886	167 / 1 / 2 / 3 / 152	325
51st	1888	152 / 1 / 179	332
52nd	1890	238 / 8 / 86	332
53rd	1892	218 / 11 / 2 / 1 / 124	356
54th	1894	93 / 9 / 1 / 253	356
55th	1896	124 / 22 / 1 / 1 / 3 / 206	357
56th	1898	161 / 5 / 1 / 1 / 2 / 187	357
57th	1900	151 / 5 / 1 / 200	357
58th	1902	176 / 4 / 206	386
59th	1904	135 / 251	386
60th	1906	167 / 1 / 223	391
61st	1908	172 / 219	391
62nd	1910	1 / 227 / 2 / 161	391
63rd	1912	291 / 2 / 10 / 134	435
64th	1914	1 / 230 / 1 / 6 / 196 / 1	435
65th	1916	1 / 214 / 1 / 3 / 215 / 1	435
66th	1918	1 / 1 / 192 / 240 / 1	435
67th	1920	1 / 131 / 1 / 303	435
68th	1922	1 / 2 / 207 / 225	435
69th	1924	2 / 3 / 183 / 1 / 246	435
70th	1926	1 / 2 / 194 / 238	435
71st	1928	1 / 164 / 270	435
72nd	1930	1 / 216 / 218	435
73rd	1932	5 / 313 / 117	435
74th	1934	7 / 3 / 322 / 103	435
75th	1936	8 / 5 / 334 / 88	435
76th	1938	1 / 2 / 1 / 262 / 169	435
77th	1940	1 / 3 / 1 / 267 / 1 / 162	435
78th	1942	1 / 2 / 1 / 222 / 209	435
79th	1944	1 / 1 / 244 / 189	435
80th	1946	1 / 188 / 246	435
81st	1948	1 / 263 / 171	435
82nd	1950	235 / 1 / 199	435
83rd	1952	213 / 1 / 221	435
84th	1954	232 / 203	435
85th	1956	234 / 201	435
86th	1958	283 / 153	436
87th	1960	262 / 175	437
88th	1962	259 / 176	435
89th	1964	295 / 140	435
90th	1966	248 / 187	435
91st	1968	243 / 192	435
92nd	1970	255 / 180	435
93rd	1972	242 / 1 / 192	435
94th	1974	291 / 144	435
95th	1976	292 / 143	435
96th	1978	277 / 157 / 1	435
97th	1980	242 / 1 / 191 / 1	435
98th	1982	269 / 165 / 1	435
99th	1984	253 / 181 / 1	435
100th	1986	258 / 177	435
101st	1988	260 / 175	435
102nd	1990	267 / 1 / 167	435
103rd	1992	258 / 1 / 176	435
104th	1994	204 / 1 / 230	435
105th	1996	207 / 2 / 226	435
106th	1998	211 / 1 / 223	435
107th	2000	212 / 2 / 221	435
108th	2002	205 / 1 / 229	435
109th	2004	202 / 1 / 232	435
110th	2006	233 / 202	435
111th	2008	257 / 178	435
112th	2010	193 / 242	435
113th	2012	201 / 234	435
114th	2014	188 / 247	435
115th	2016	194 / 241	435
116th	2018	235 / 199	435
117th	2020	222 / 213	435
118th	2022	213 / 222	435
119th	2024	215 / 220	435

== Latest election results and party standings ==
Balance of power as of November 3, 2026

Below is a chart that shows the practical balance of power in the House, based on the number of members caucusing with each party. Independents are counted with the party with which they caucus. Arrows show the threshold for a majority of seats.

	↓
Two-party	219	214
Counting vacancies	219	214
	↑
	Republican	Democratic

Affiliation	Members	Delegates/resident commissioner (non-voting)	State majorities
Republican	219	3	30
Democratic	214	3	18
Vacant	2		
Total	435	6	50
Majority (Note: The number of the majority party's voting representatives in the House in excess of the minimum number required to have an absolute majority of voting representatives.)	2		

== See also ==
- 2024 United States House of Representatives elections – House elections for the 119th U.S. Congress
- List of current United States representatives
- List of portraits in the United States House of Representatives collection (A–J)
- Party divisions of United States Congresses
- Seniority in the United States House of Representatives
- Third-party members of the United States House of Representatives
- U.S. representative bibliography (congressional memoirs)
- Women in the United States House of Representatives
- Act of Congress
