= Pennsylvania Avenue =

Street in Maryland and the District of Columbia, United States

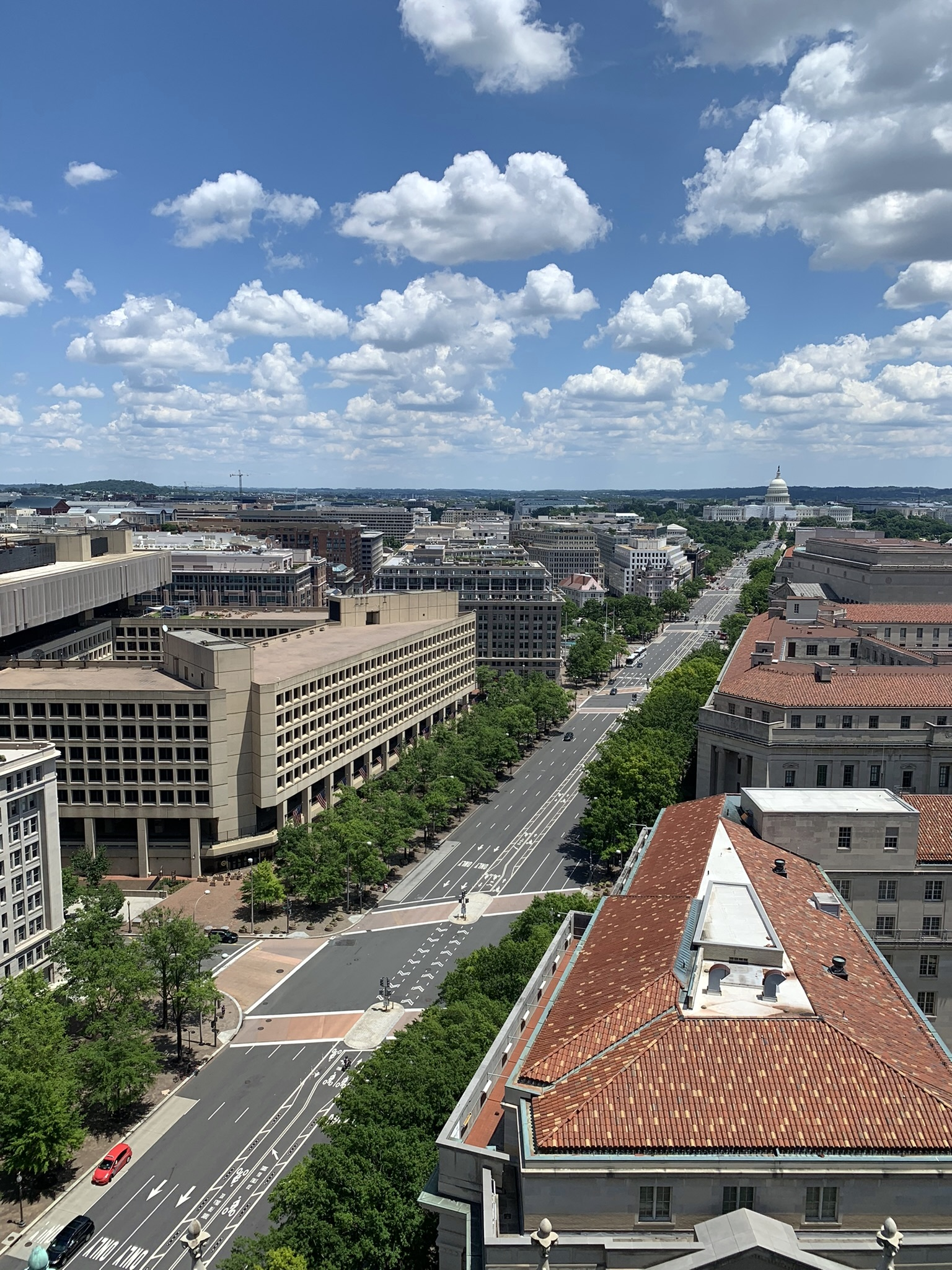
- Pennsylvania Avenue with the U.S. Capitol in the background in June 2022
- Interactive map of Pennsylvania Avenue
- Maintained by: DDOT and MDSHA
- Width: 160 feet
- Component highways: US 1 Alt. in Washington, DC; MD 4 from the DC–Maryland border on the northwestern edge of Suitland, MD to eastern terminus at MD 717 in Upper Marlboro, MD
- Location: Washington, D.C. and Prince George's County, Maryland in the United States
- West end: M Street NW / 29th Street NW in Washington, DC
- Major junctions: US 29 in Washington, DC; 17th Street NW in Washington, DC; E Street NW / 15th Street NW in Washington, DC; US 1 / US 50 in Washington, DC; 1st Street NW in Washington, DC; Independence Avenue SE / 2nd Street SE in Washington, DC; DC 295 in Washington, DC; MD 458 in Suitland, MD; I-95 / I-495 at the Forestville, MD–Westphalia, MD line; MD 337 in Westphalia, MD; MD 223 in Melwood, MD
- East end: MD 717 in Upper Marlboro, MD
← US 1	DC 4	→ DC 5

Pennsylvania Avenue is a primarily diagonal street in Washington, D.C., that connects the United States Capitol with the White House and then crosses northwest Washington, D.C., to Georgetown. Traveling through southeast Washington from the Capitol, it enters Prince George's County, Maryland, and becomes MD Route 4 (MD 4) and then MD 717 in Upper Marlboro, and finally Stephanie Roper Highway.

The section of the avenue between the White House, which is sometimes referred to by its address "1600 Pennsylvania Avenue", and the Capitol forms the basis for the Pennsylvania Avenue National Historic Site and is sometimes referred to as "America's Main Street"; it is the location of official parades and processions, and periodic protest marches. Pennsylvania Avenue is an important commuter road and is part of the National Highway System.

== Route ==
The avenue runs for 5.8 miles (9.3 km) in Washington, D.C., but the 1.2 miles (1.9 km) of Pennsylvania Avenue from the White House to the United States Capitol building is far and away the most famed section of the avenue. It continues within the city for 3.5 miles (5.6 km), from the southeast corner of the Capitol grounds through the Capitol Hill neighborhood, and over the Anacostia River on the John Philip Sousa Bridge. Crossing most of Prince George's County, Maryland, it ends 9.5 miles (15.3 km) from the Washington, D.C., border in Maryland at the junction with MD 717 in Upper Marlboro, where the name changes to Stephanie Roper Highway, for a total length of 15.3 miles (24.6 km). Stephanie Roper Highway used to be Pennsylvania Avenue, but was renamed in 2012. In addition to its street names, in Maryland it is designated as Maryland Route 4.

Northwest of the White House, Pennsylvania Avenue runs for 1.4 miles (2.3 km) to its end at M Street N.W. in Georgetown, just beyond the Pennsylvania Avenue Bridge over Rock Creek. From 1862 to 1962, streetcars ran the length of the avenue from Georgetown to the Anacostia River.

== History ==
=== 18th century ===
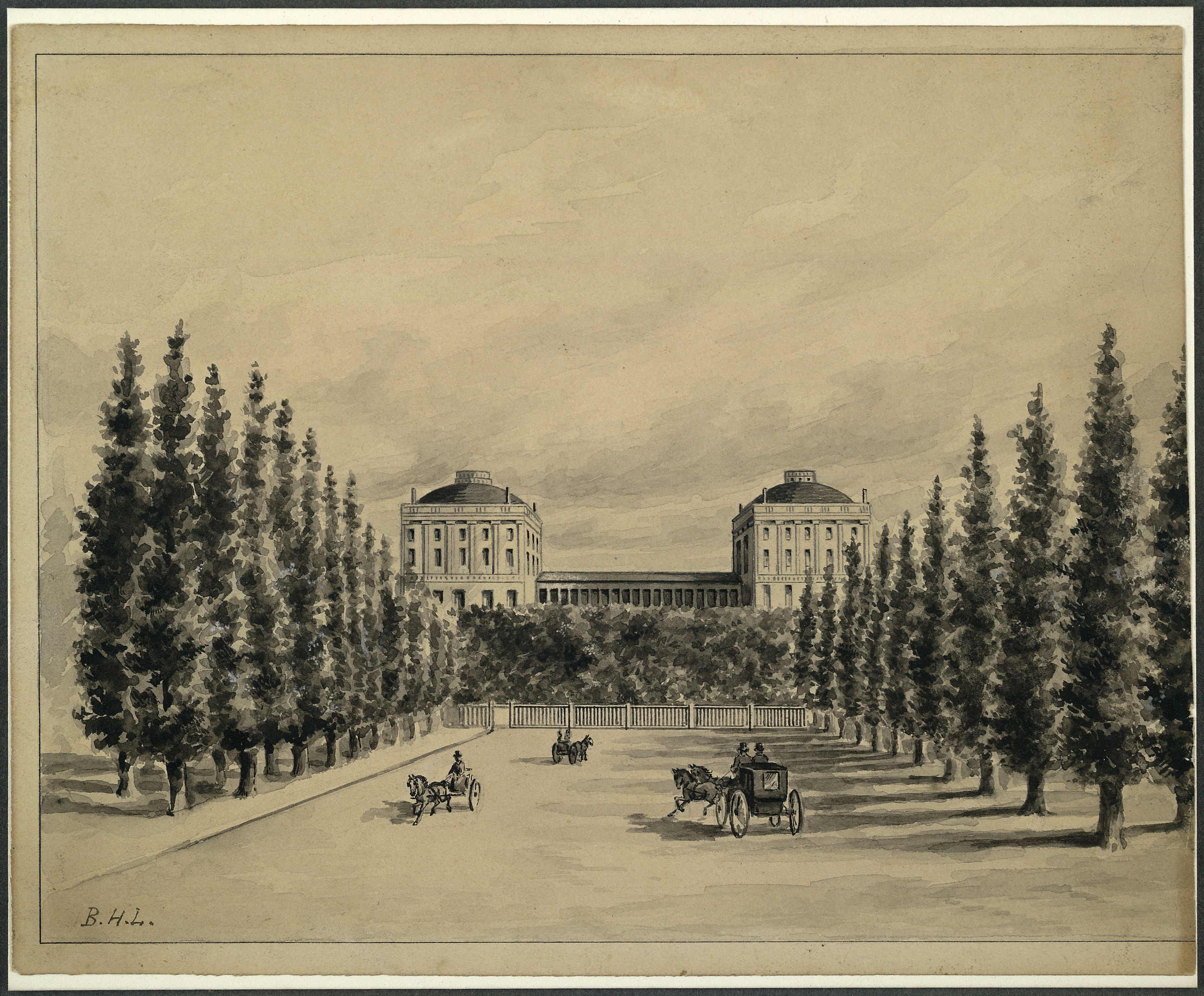
An illustration of Pennsylvania Avenue and the U.S. Capitol before it was burned down by the British Army on August 24, 1814, during the War of 1812

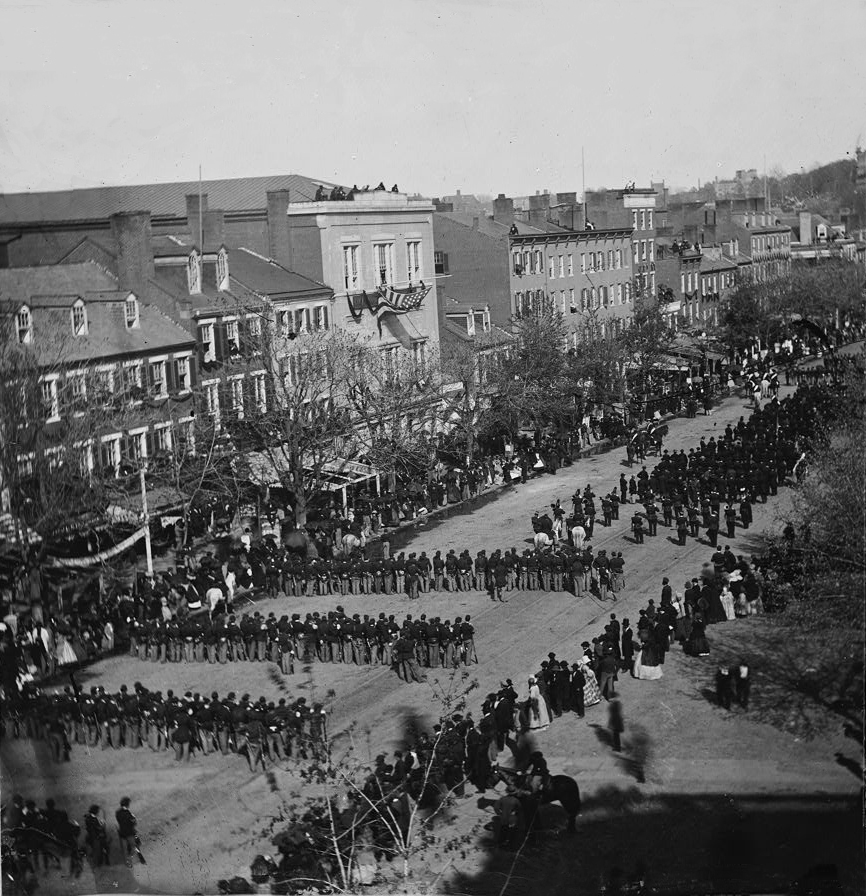
Military units marching down Pennsylvania Avenue in Washington D.C., during the state funeral for Abraham Lincoln on April 19, 1865

Although Pennsylvania Avenue extends six miles (10 km) in Washington, D.C., the expanse between the White House and the United States Capitol constitutes the ceremonial heart of the nation. It was designed by Pierre Charles L'Enfant, and was one of the earliest streets constructed in the city. The width of the avenue was set at 160 feet, identical to the narrowest points of the Champs-Élysées in Paris that L'Enfant is likely to have examined. The first documented reference to the street as Pennsylvania Avenue was in a 1791 letter from Thomas Jefferson. One theory behind the avenue's name is that it was named for Pennsylvania as consolation for moving the capital from Philadelphia in 1800 and in recognition of Pennsylvania's historical significance in the nation's founding. Both Jefferson and Washington considered Pennsylvania Avenue an important feature of the new capital. The stretch outside the White House was established in 1804 when President Jefferson ordered the road to be cut through President's Park. For decades, Pennsylvania Avenue was a wide dirt road ridiculed by Jefferson as "The Great Serbonian Bog", he planted it with rows of fast-growing Populus nigra.

=== 19th century ===
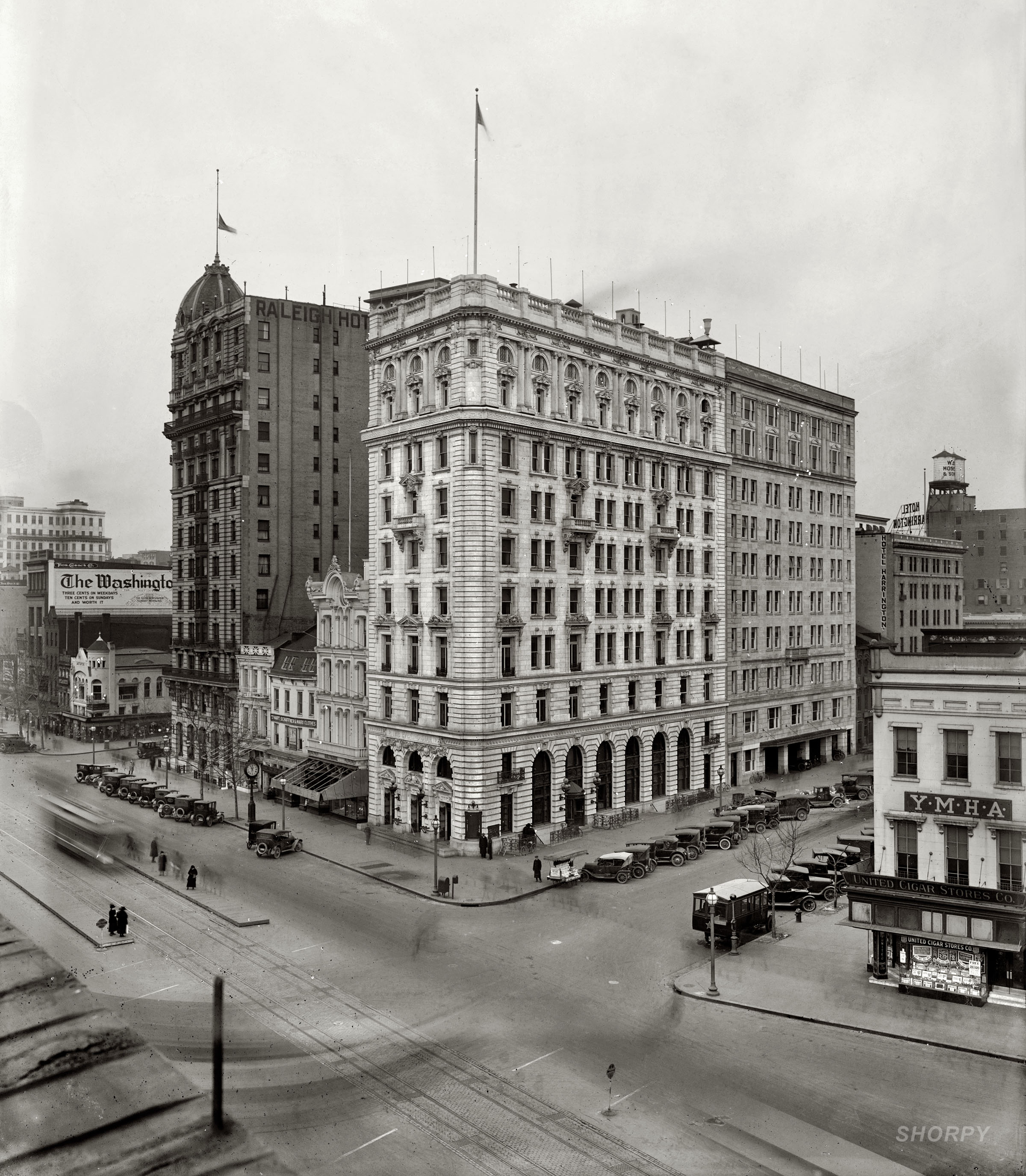
The intersection of 11th Street and Pennsylvania Avenue, N.W., in 1921

In 1832, in an effort to tame dust and dirt on Pennsylvania Avenue, it was paved using the macadam method. But over the years, other pavement methods were trialed on the avenue: cobblestones in 1849 followed by Belgian blocks and then, in 1871, wooden blocks.

Pennsylvania Avenue once provided an unobstructed view between the White House and the Capitol. The construction of an expansion to the Treasury Building blocked this view, and supposedly President Andrew Jackson did this on purpose. Relations between the president and Congress were strained, and Jackson did not want to see the Capitol out his window, though in reality the Treasury Building was simply built on what was cheap government land.

In 1876, as part of an initiative begun by President Ulysses S. Grant to see the city's streets improved, Pennsylvania Avenue was paved with asphalt by Civil War veteran William W. Averell using Trinidad and Guanoco lakes asphalt.

=== 20th century ===
District of Columbia Route 4
- Location: Washington, District of Columbia

In 1959, Pennsylvania Avenue was extended from the Washington, D.C., border with Maryland to Dower House Road in Upper Marlboro, Maryland.

On September 30, 1965, portions of the avenue and surrounding area were designated the Pennsylvania Avenue National Historic Site. The National Park Service administers this area which includes the United States Navy Memorial, Old Post Office Tower, and Pershing Park. After the Great Depression in the 1930s and the move of affluent families to suburbs in the 1950s, Pennsylvania Avenue became increasingly blighted. John F. Kennedy and Lyndon B. Johnson tried to redevelop the street as part of the New Frontier and Great Society reforms, but the avenue further declined after the 1968 Washington, D.C., riots in the aftermath of the assassination of Martin Luther King Jr.

In 1972, Congress created the Pennsylvania Avenue Development Corporation (PADC) to rehabilitate the street between the Capitol and the White House, an area seen as blighted. The new organization was given the mandate of developing Pennsylvania Avenue "in a manner suitable to its ceremonial, physical, and historic relationship to the legislative and executive branches of the federal government".

In the 1980s, renovations were made to the Willard Hotel, the Old Post Office, and Washington Union Station, each located on or adjacent to Pennsylvania Avenue.

=== 21st century ===
In 2010, the District of Columbia designated Pennsylvania Avenue from the southwestern terminus of John Philip Sousa Bridge to the Maryland state line to be a "D.C. Great Street". The city spent $430 million to beautify the street and improve the roadway.

Due to the COVID-19 pandemic, businesses along Pennsylvania Avenue faced significant challenges and closures. With reduced tourism, remote work trends keeping office buildings quieter, and a historical lack of the avenue itself being a primary destination, many establishments struggled to sustain operations. The combination of decreased foot traffic and shifting consumer behavior further strained local businesses, leading to closures as they struggled to adapt to the new economic realities.

In 2022, the National Capital Planning Commission (NCPC) launched the Pennsylvania Avenue Initiative to revitalize the iconic thoroughfare by transforming it into a dynamic public space and transportation corridor. Accelerated by the changes brought about by remote work during the COVID-19 pandemic, the initiative aims to re-imagine Pennsylvania Avenue from its current eight-lane design predominantly catering to cars to a more inclusive and equitable space. This vision includes accommodating a variety of activities and users, such as pedestrians, cyclists, buses, emergency vehicles, and delivery trucks, alongside hosting events and fostering community engagement.

To achieve this transformation, the initiative involves collaborative efforts between NCPC and consulting teams like HR&A Advisors. They are tasked with updating traffic studies to explore reallocating roadway space for new sidewalks, bike lanes, transit-only lanes, mid-block crossings, and other streetscape elements. Additionally, the initiative prioritizes refining early design concepts into preferred alternatives based on economic feasibility, stakeholder input, and environmental considerations. Ultimately, the goal is to elevate Pennsylvania Avenue's status as a premier public space in Washington, DC, comparable to other renowned urban boulevards around the world.

In 2024, NCPC is expected to announce a second consultant team to help develop the New Pennsylvania Avenue Plan that will address design and infrastructure improvements along the corridor and adjoining public spaces.

=== Parades and protests ===
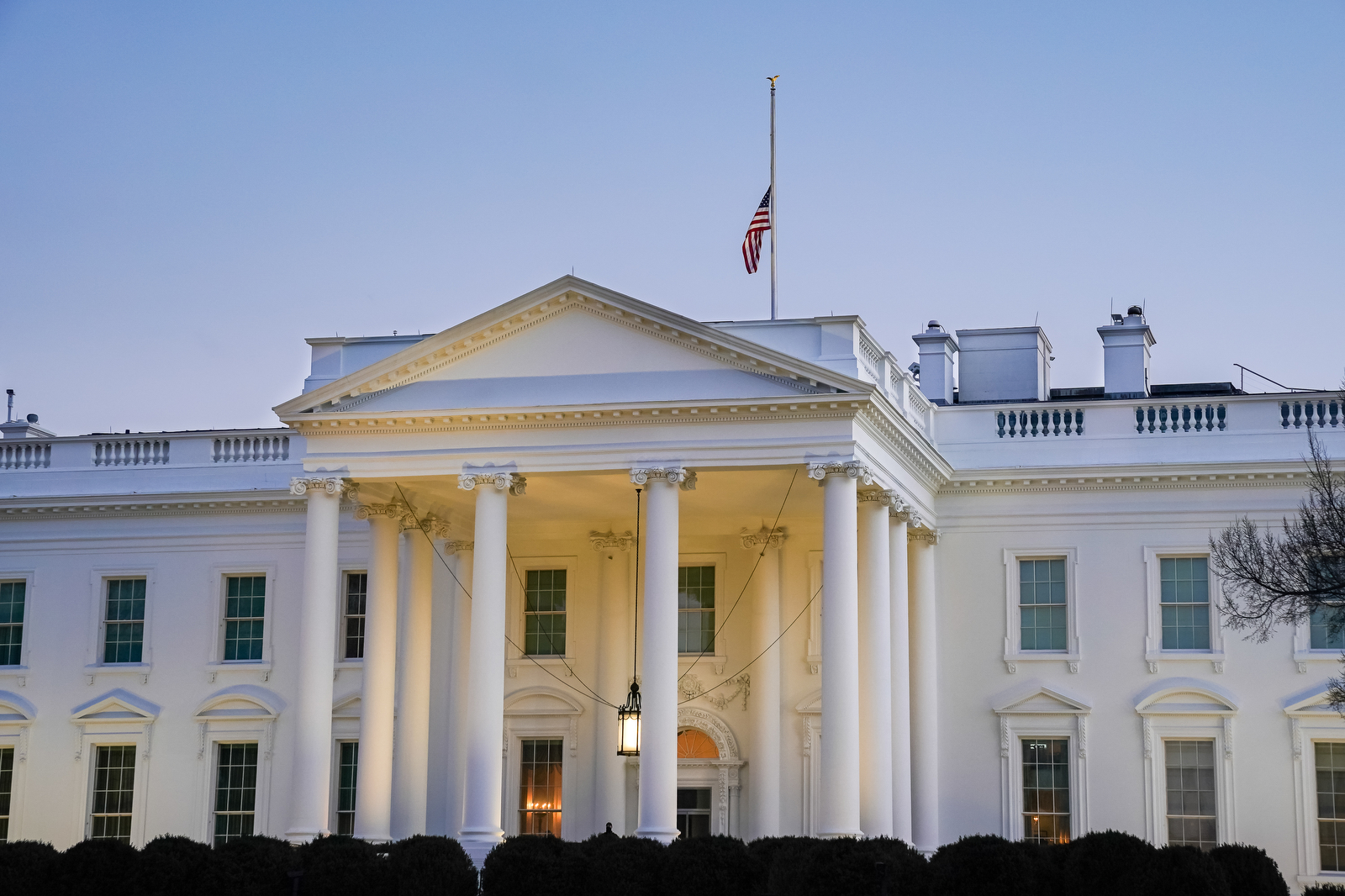
The White House at 1600 Pennsylvania Avenue N.W.

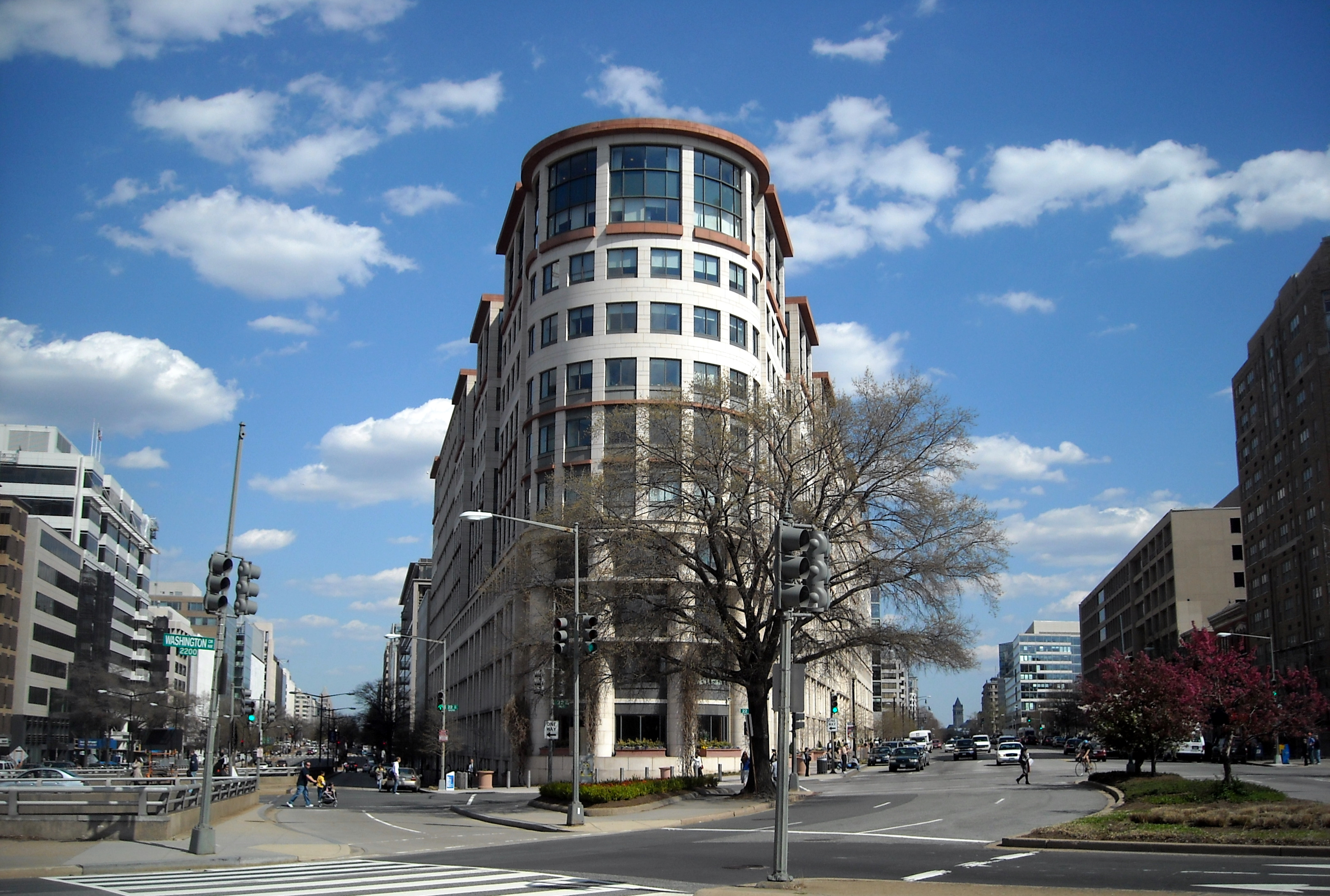
The crossroads of K Street and Pennsylvania Avenue in the Foggy Bottom neighborhood

==== Presidential inaugurations ====
Ever since an impromptu procession formed around Jefferson's second inauguration, every U.S. president except Ronald Reagan and Donald Trump during their respective second inaugurations, (1985 and 2025) have paraded down Pennsylvania Avenue after taking the oath of office. Reagan and Trump both paraded up the avenue for their respective first inaugurations (January 1981 and January 2017) but not following their respective second inaugurations (1985 because freezing temperatures and high winds made it dangerous and 2025 because of polar vortex, extreme cold, and high winds).

==== Presidential funeral processions ====
From William Henry Harrison to Jimmy Carter, the funeral corteges of seven of the eight presidents who died in office and three former presidents followed this route. Franklin Roosevelt was the only president who died in office whose cortege did not follow this route.

Abraham Lincoln's funeral cortege solemnly proceeded along Pennsylvania Avenue in 1865; only weeks later, the end of the American Civil War was celebrated with the Grand Review of the Armies when the Army of the Potomac paraded more joyously along the avenue. The funeral processions of Lyndon B. Johnson, Ford, and Carter proceeded down Pennsylvania Avenue. For Lyndon Johnson, the cortege was along Pennsylvania Avenue from U.S. Capitol to National City Christian Church, where he often worshiped and where his funeral was held. Ford's funeral went up Pennsylvania Avenue, pausing at the White House en route to Washington National Cathedral, where his funeral was held. Carter's funeral procession went down Pennsylvania Avenue to the Capitol, with a casket transfer stop the United States Navy Memorial.

==== Protests and celebrations ====
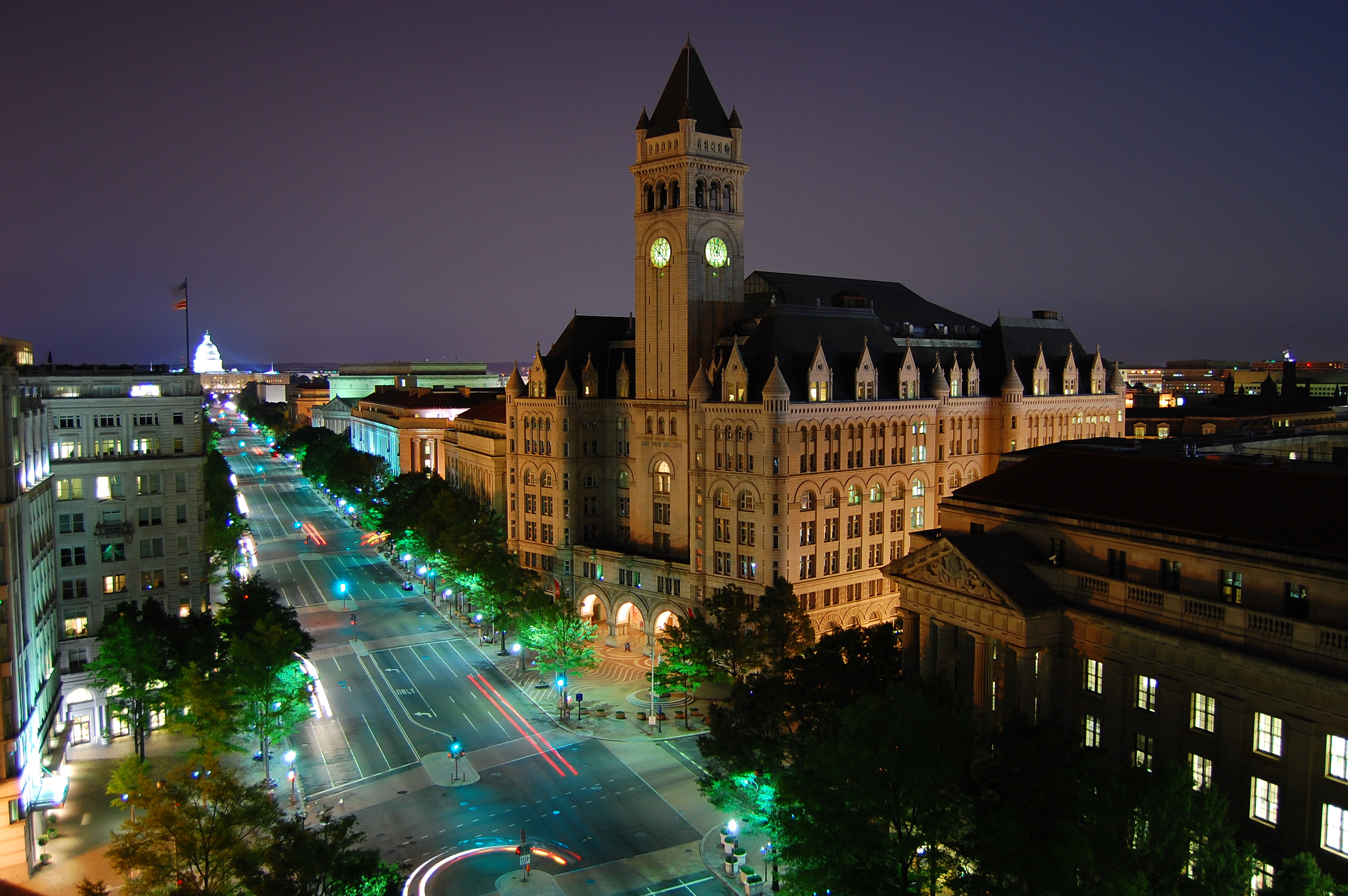
A southeast view down Pennsylvania Avenue towards the Old Post Office Pavilion and U.S. Capitol

In addition to serving as a location for official functions, Pennsylvania Avenue is a traditional parade and protest route of ordinary citizens. During the depression of the 1890s, Jacob Coxey marched 500 supporters down Pennsylvania Avenue to the U.S. Capitol to demand federal aid for the unemployed. Similarly, on the eve of Woodrow Wilson's 1913 inauguration, Alice Paul masterminded a parade, the Woman Suffrage Procession, highlighting the women's suffrage movement. In July 1932, a contingent of the Bonus Expeditionary Force carried flags up Pennsylvania Avenue to the White House, where they formed picket lines.

Pennsylvania Avenue also has served as a background for more lighthearted celebrations, including a series of Shriner's parades in the 1920s and 1930s. Thomas and Concepcion Picciotto are the founders of the White House Peace Vigil, the longest-running anti-nuclear peace vigil in the nation at Lafayette Square on the 1600 block of Pennsylvania Avenue.

=== Security measures ===
After the Oklahoma City bombing in April 1995, the Secret Service closed the portion of Pennsylvania Avenue in front of the White House permanently to all vehicular traffic. Pedestrian and bicycle traffic, however, was still permitted on the sidewalk. After the September 11 attacks, all traffic in front of the White House was prohibited. Pedestrian traffic resumed in 2004. Vehicular traffic near the White House is now redirected to H Street or Constitution Avenue, both of which eventually link back with Pennsylvania Avenue.

In 2002, the National Capital Planning Commission invited several prominent landscape architects to submit proposals for the redesign of Pennsylvania Avenue at the White House, with the intention that the security measures would be woven into an overall plan for the precinct and a more welcoming public space might be created. The winning entry by a firm run by Michael Van Valkenburgh proposed a very simple approach to planting, paving, and the integration of required security steps. Construction was completed in 2004.

== Sites of interest ==
From east to west:

- John Philip Sousa Bridge
- Barney Circle
- United States Capitol
- Peace Monument
- National Gallery of Art, East Building
- John Marshall Park
- Embassy of Canada
- Johns Hopkins University Bloomberg Center
- Federal Trade Commission Building
- National Archives Building
- United States Navy Memorial
- J. Edgar Hoover Building (FBI headquarters)
- Robert F. Kennedy Department of Justice Building (Department of Justice headquarters)
- 1001 Pennsylvania Avenue (World headquarters of The Carlyle Group)
- Old Post Office Pavilion
- Ronald Reagan Building and International Trade Center
- John A. Wilson Building
- Freedom Plaza
- National World War I Memorial
- Treasury Building
- White House
- Lafayette Square
- Blair House
- Renwick Gallery
- World Bank
- Embassy of Mexico
- George Washington University
- International Finance Corporation
- Washington Circle
- Spanish Embassy
- Rock Creek Park
- Georgetown

The National Theatre and Warner Theatre use Pennsylvania Avenue mailing addresses, although the theaters are nearby on E Street and 13th Street respectively.

== Transit service ==
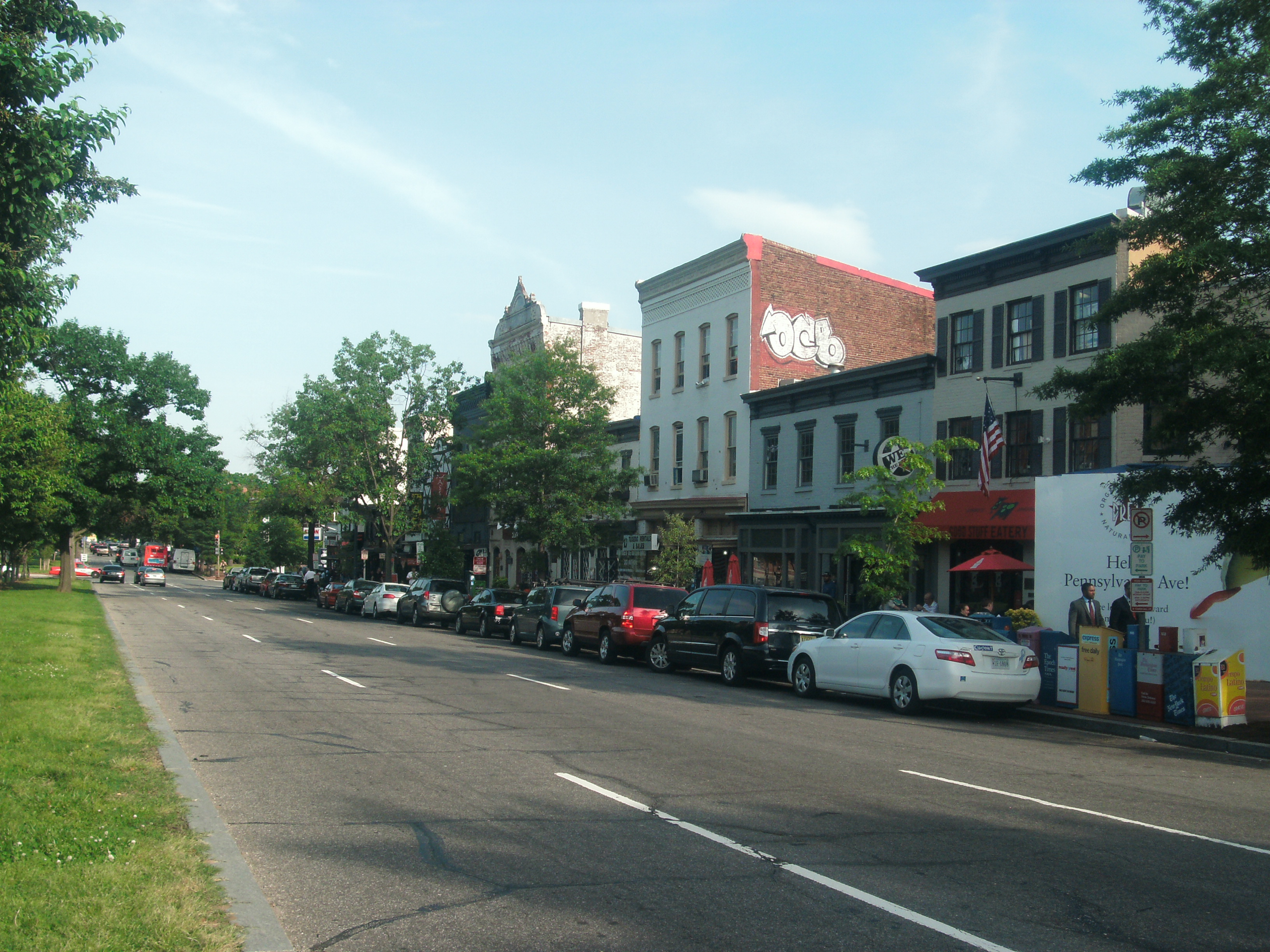
Storefronts on Pennsylvania Avenue in the city's Capitol Hill neighborhood

A parade on Pennsylvania Avenue, N.W., during the second inauguration of Barack Obama on January 21, 2013

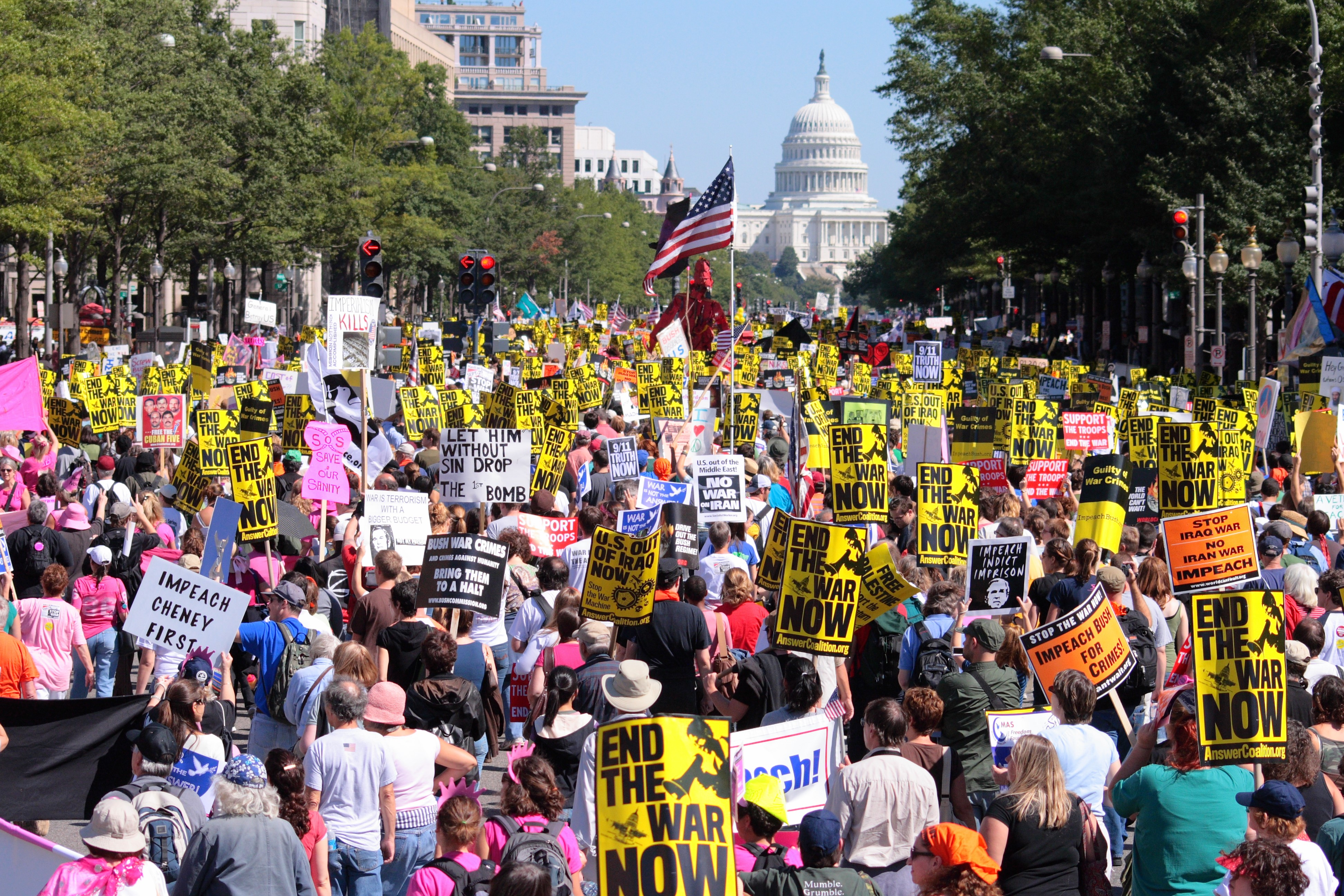
Protesters on Pennsylvania Avenue during the 2007 protests against the Iraq War

=== Metrobus ===
The following Metrobus routes travel along the street (listed from west to east):

- 30N (Branch Ave. SE to Independence Ave. SE, then 7th St. N.W. to 15th St. N.W., then H St. N.W. to M St. N.W.)
- 30S (Minnesota Ave. SE to Independence Ave. SE, then 7th St. N.W. to 15th St. N.W., then H St. N.W. to M St. N.W.)
- 38B (Eye St. N.W. to M St. N.W.)
- 33 (9th St. N.W. to 15th St. N.W., then H St. N.W. to M St. N.W.)
- 31, D5 (Washington Circle to M St. N.W.)
- 36 (Branch Ave. SE to Independence Ave. SE, then 7th St. N.W. to 15th St. N.W., then H St. N.W. to Washington Circle)
- 32 (Minnesota Ave. SE to Independence Ave. SE, then 7th St. N.W. to 15th St. N.W., then H St. N.W. to Washington Circle)
- 39 (Limited-stop service from Southern Ave. to Independence Ave., then 7th St. N.W. to 15th St. N.W., then Eye St. N.W. to Washington Circle)
- 37 (Limited-stop service from 7th St. N.W. to 15th St. N.W.)
- 16C (6th St. N.W. to 12th St. N.W.)
- P6 (4th St. N.W. to 11th St. N.W.)
- 34 (Minnesota Ave. SE to Independence Ave. SE)
- M6 (Alabama Ave. SE to Potomac Ave. SE)
- B2, V4 (Minnesota Ave. SE to Potomac Ave. SE)
- V12 (Brooks Dr. to Shadyside Ave.)
- K12 (Forestville Rd. to Parkland Dr., then Walters La. to Donnell Dr.)
- J12 (Eastbound only from Forestville Rd. to Old Marlboro Pike)

=== DC Circulator ===
The DC Circulator travels along the street:

- Georgetown-Union Station (20th St. N.W. to M St. N.W.)

=== MTA Maryland Commuter Bus ===
The following MTA Maryland Commuter Bus routes travel along the street:

- 904 (Anacostia Freeway to Independence Ave., then 7th St. NW to 11th St. NW)
- 905 (7th St. N.W. to 11th St. N.W.)

=== Bus ===
The following routes of TheBus serve Pennsylvania Ave. in Prince George's County:

- 24 (Old Silver Hill Rd. to Brooks Dr.)
- 20 (Marlboro Pike to Donnell Dr.)

=== Washington Metro ===
The following Washington Metro stations have entrances located near Pennsylvania Avenue:

- Potomac Avenue, Eastern Market, Federal Triangle, Foggy Bottom–GWU
  Blue Line
  Orange Line
  Silver Line
- Archives
  Green Line
  Yellow Line
