= Parliament Square Peace Campaign =

Anti-war protest in London, 2001 to 2013

Coordinates: 51°30′1.94″N -00°07′34.84″W

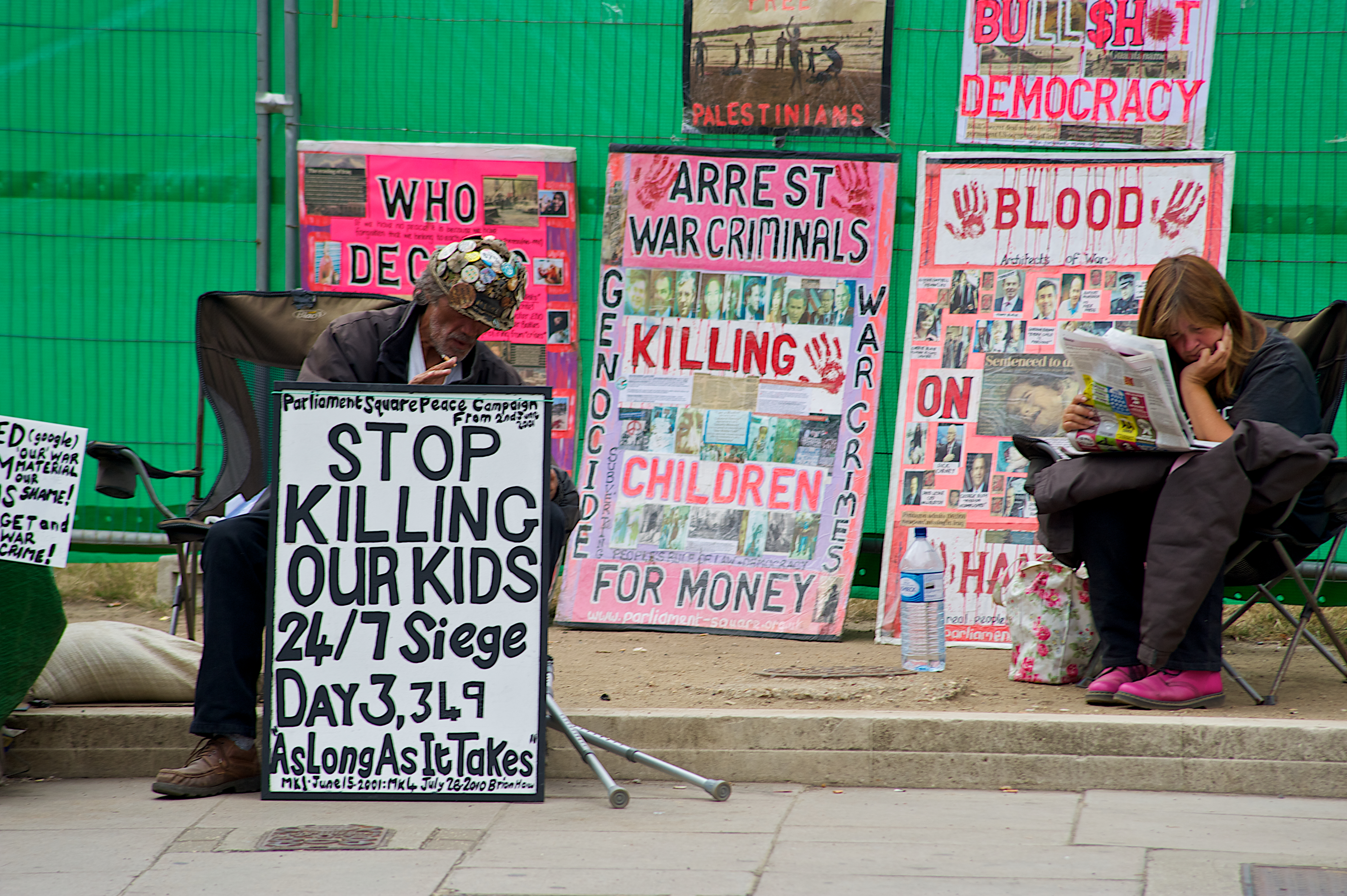
Brian Haw and Barbara Tucker at the Parliament Square Peace Campaign site, in August 2010

The Parliament Square Peace Campaign was a peace camp outside the Palace of Westminster in Parliament Square, London, from 2001 to 2013. Activist Brian Haw launched the campaign at the site on 2 June 2001, initially as an around-the-clock protest in response to the United Nations economic sanctions imposed on Iraq. His protest grew broader following the war in Afghanistan and 2003 invasion of Iraq. He was joined by Barbara Tucker in December 2005, and stayed at the site day and night for nearly a decade.

Tucker carried on the campaign following Haw's death in June 2011. The London Evening Standard reported in January 2013 that Tucker had started a hunger strike after protesting in the square for a total of eight years. The permanent protest camp was removed later in 2013.

== See also ==
- Anti-war movement
- Criticism of the war on terror
- Peace movement
- Stop the War Coalition
- White House Peace Vigil
- List of peace activists
- Thomas
- Concepcion Picciotto
- Ellen Thomas
- Barbara Grace Tucker
- Opposition to the War in Afghanistan (2001–2021)
- Opposition to the Iraq War

== Documentaries ==
- Brian & Co. Parliament Square SW1 by Yumiko Hayakawa
- Letters from Parliament Square by Carlos Serrano Azcona
