= Peace camp =

Form of physical protest camp

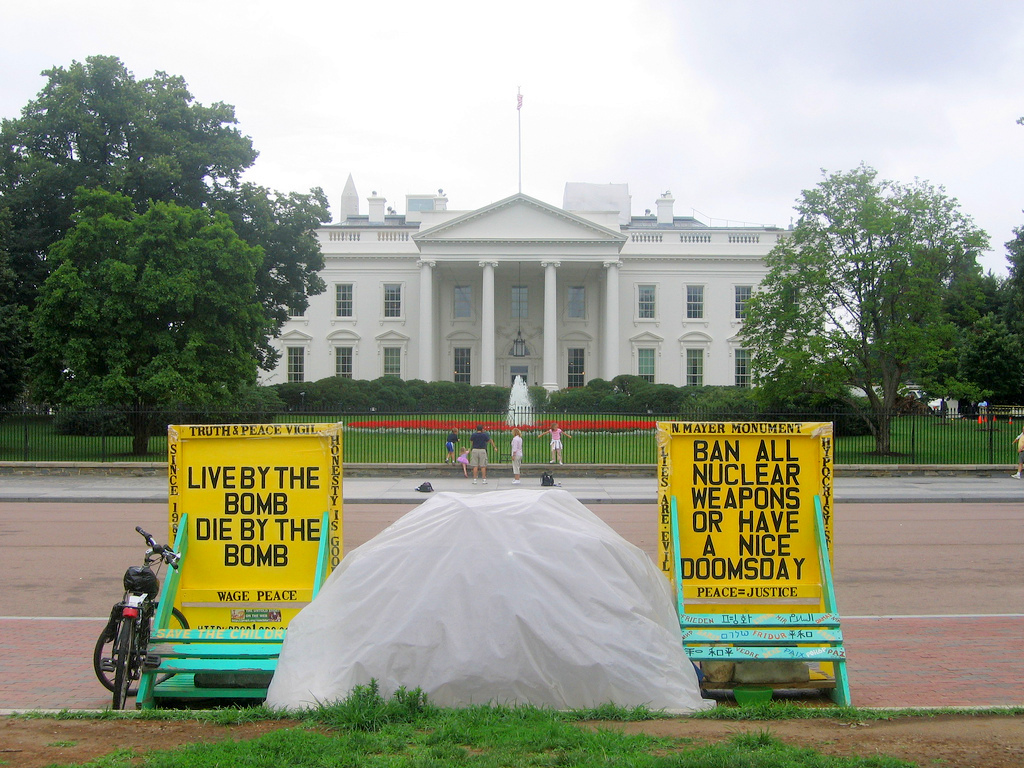
The White House Peace Vigil is the longest running peace vigil in US history; started by Thomas in 1981.

Peace camps are a form of physical protest camp that is focused on anti-war and anti-nuclear activity. They are set up outside military bases by members of the peace movement who oppose either the existence of the military bases themselves, the armaments held there, or the politics of those who control the bases. They began in the 1920s and became prominent in 1982 due to the worldwide publicity generated by the Greenham Common Women's Peace Camp. They were particularly a phenomenon of the United Kingdom in the 1980s where they were associated with sentiment against American imperialism but Peace Camps have existed at other times and places since the 1920s.

== Reasoning behind the protest ==
In the United Kingdom, people came to live outside military bases at protest camps in order to witness their opposition to and nonviolently protest against the presence of nuclear weapons in Europe that were directed against the then Soviet Union by the United States, calling for nuclear disarmament. The women at Greenham Common Women's Peace Camp were particularly against the placing of US cruise missiles there, something they claimed made the area a direct target of Soviet Union aggression. During the 1980s the United States Air Force had land-based cruise missiles at several of the above locations, not only Greenham Common; they have since been moved back to the United States, though there remains a US military presence in the UK, and the UK continues to possess and develop nuclear weapons itself. Due to these factors, the concept of the peace camp remains alive today, and because of the presence of Faslane Peace camp, there has continuously been at least one peace camp outside a military base in the UK since 1982.

== History ==
The first peace camps are known to have originated in the 1920s.

=== 1980s ===
The first modern peace camps were the various (initially mixed but later) women-only peace camps at the military base at Greenham Common, England, set up in 1981. Greenham Common Women's Peace Camp maintained a presence at the camp until 2000. Women-only peace camps were based at Waddington, Lincs from April – September 1982 and Capenhurst from October 1982 – March 1983. Other, mixed-sex, peace camps sprang up at the military bases of Upper Heyford, Daws Hill in High Wycombe, RAF Molesworth, Lakenheath, Naphill and Faslane. Faslane Peace Camp, which was established in 1982, is still in existence today. There has been a women's peace camp at Aldermaston for one weekend a month since 1985 that continues to meet.

==== Naphill ====
A bunker was constructed for RAF Strike Command on National Trust land (Bradenham Village) near High Wycombe, England between 1983 and 1985. Naphill Peace camp was set up to witness and oppose this construction. The Angry Pacifist magazine was produced out of Naphill Peace camp.

==== White House Peace Vigil ====
Thomas and Concepcion Picciotto are founders of the longest running peace vigil in the US. The White House Peace Vigil has been located opposite the White House at Lafayette Square on the 1600 block of Pennsylvania Avenue in Washington, D.C. since June 3, 1981.

==== Brambles Farm, Waterlooville, Hampshire ====
The Brambles Farm Peace Camp was set up in 1982 on the site of a research and development facility for the production of the Spearfish 7525 torpedo for the Royal Navy. The camp, although anti-war and anti-nuclear in its beliefs, was also supported and attended by local people demonstrating against the loss of green space and the lack of public consultation. The protesters held up the construction work for a number of months and was visited by some 3,000 people from this country and abroad. A Torpedo Town festival was held in the area for a number of years afterwards, the largest in 1991 at Liphook in Hampshire when some 25,000 people danced to the Spiral Tribe sound system. These festivals fell foul of the rave party and free festival crackdown in the early 1990s by the Tory government.

==== Seneca County, New York ====
In 1983, feminists established the Seneca Women's Encampment for a Future of Peace and Justice in Romulus, New York, the site of the 1848 Seneca Falls Convention, to demand the abolition of nuclear weapons. Social justice photography Mima Cataldo photographed this event.

=== 21st century ===
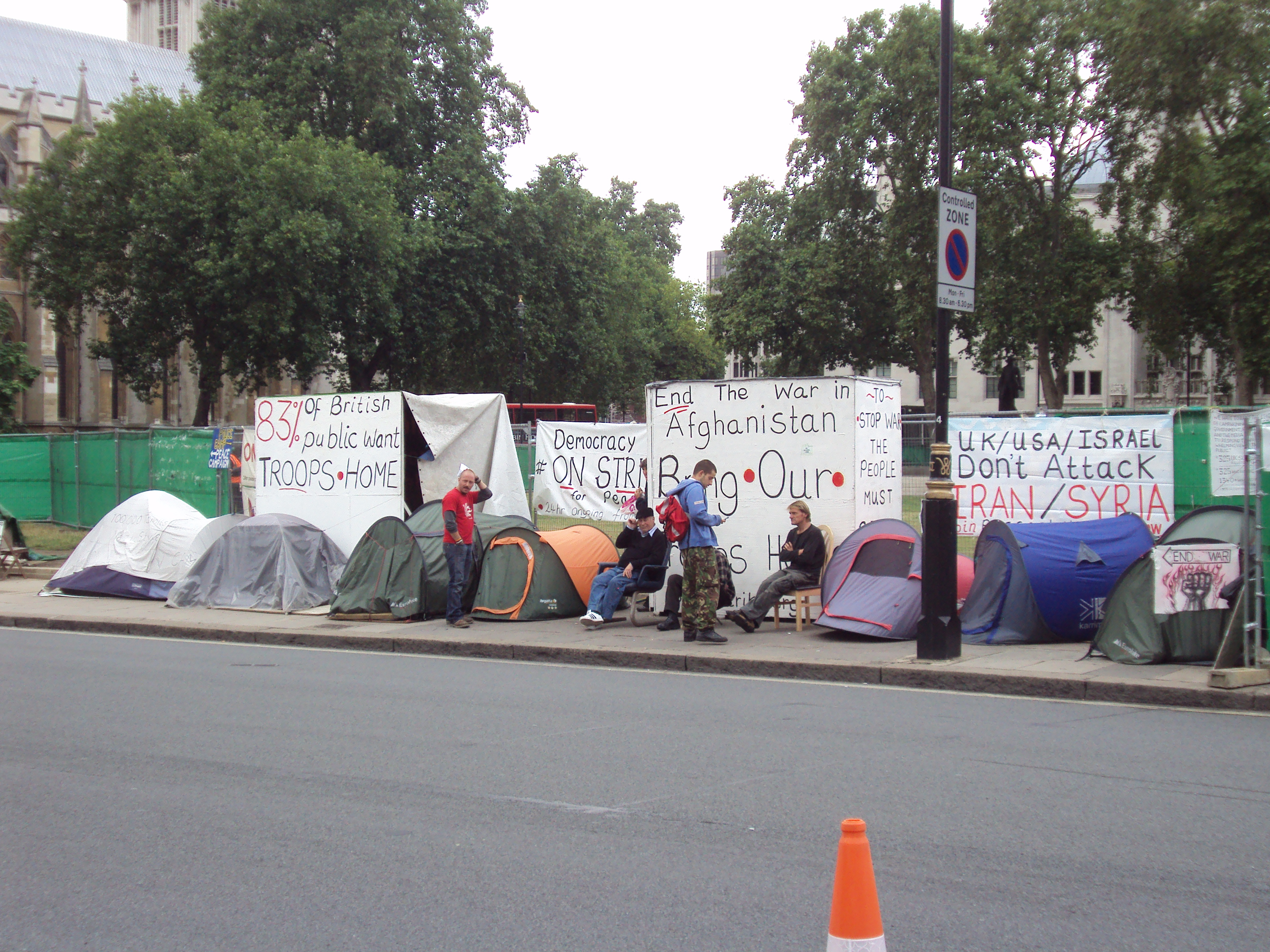
Parliament Square Peace Campaign opposite the British parliament, 2010

In 2001 Brian Haw set up the Parliament Square Peace Campaign outside the Houses of Parliament in London. In August 2007, others who had joined him were evicted, but he was allowed to stay.

A peace camp was set up at Fairford on 17 February 2003 in protest against the Iraq War.

In February 2005, peace activists and residents began a peace camp at the village of Daechuri, South Korea, in opposition to the expansion of Camp Humphreys, which declared autonomy from Korea on February 7, 2006. As of October 2006, resisting residents remain on-site, despite demolition of homes owned by residents who have accepted compensation.

On May 13, 2005, protesters set up a peace camp on Drake's Island, just off Plymouth.

In August 2005, Cindy Sheehan set up Camp Casey, a peace camp named after her son, outside the Texas ranch of United States President George W. Bush, through which she has attracted considerable media attention.

== Alternate usages of the term ==
The term peace camp is primarily used for a form of anti-war protest camp particularly prevalent in the UK in the 1980s, however, it is also sometimes used to describe political factions before or during wartime that are opposed to a particular war. These are not a physical camps but political alliances. Currently, there is an Israeli peace camp.

In addition, the term is sometimes used for summer camps that bring together youth from different groups in conflict (e.g., Palestinian and Israeli youth) to work towards transformation and improvement of mutual relations. While the organizers of such camps clearly support peaceful solutions, participants may not do so, or at least not to the same extent. In addition, these camps are not intended as a "protest camp", but rather to constructively work towards their goals and bring about change in the participants, which are intended to serve as disseminators of peaceful attitudes in their home communities.

In the early 19th Century, "Apaches de Paz" or Apache peace camps were established for the purpose of religious conversion. They were established near presidios in the early 19th century by the Spanish in what is now Mexico and the southwestern United States. These were administrated by the Roman Catholic Church to convert the Apaches to Roman Catholicism and - in the eyes of the Spanish - gaining the salvation of the Apaches. Rations and farming supplies were also given out at the camps in an attempt to turn the Apaches into farmers.

== See also ==
- List of peace activists
