= Dwight Watson =

Dwight Watson may refer to:

- Dwight Watson (farmer) (born 1952), tobacco farmer who drove a tractor into Washington, D.C., and claimed to have explosives
- Dwight Watson (American football) (1871–1920), American football player and coach
