= Ellen Thomas =

American peace activist (born 1947)

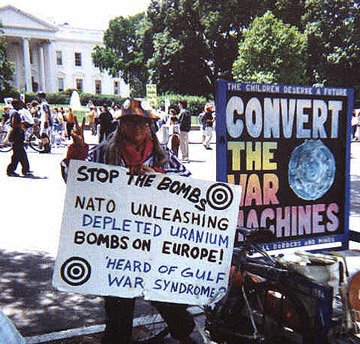
- Born: Ellen Thomas; January 24, 1947 (age 79); New York City, New York, US
- Occupation: Peace activist
- Spouse: Thomas (m. 1984; died 2009)

Ellen Thomas (born January 24, 1947) is an American peace activist. She first became involved with the White House Peace Vigil on April 13, 1984. The daughter of a US Marine, Thomas was born in Brooklyn and grew up in California. She became opposed to nuclear weapons during her childhood. In protest at the policies of the United States government, she became a tax resister by simply living below the income tax threshold.

On May 6, 1984, Ellen Benjamin married Thomas in a Quaker wedding to become Ellen Thomas. Thomas and her husband protested together for a number of years, until his death in January 2009 of pulmonary disease.

Ellen also heads The Proposition One Non-Radioactive Nuclear Review, a traveling multimedia troupe that educates the public on the dangers of a nuclear future. In 1993 she helped coordinate the successful Washington DC ballot initiative for Nuclear Disarmament and Economic Conversion. Ellen formally served on the Washington Peace Center's board of directors, but has since moved to North Carolina.

The Oracles of Pennsylvania Avenue (2012) by Tim Wilkerson, a documentary commissioned by the Al Jazeera Documentary Channel, recounts the lives of William and Ellen Thomas, Concepción Picciotto and Norman Mayer.

== See also ==
- List of peace activists
- Concepción Picciotto
- Brian Haw
- Parliament Square Peace Campaign
