= Barbara Grace Tucker =

Australian peace activist

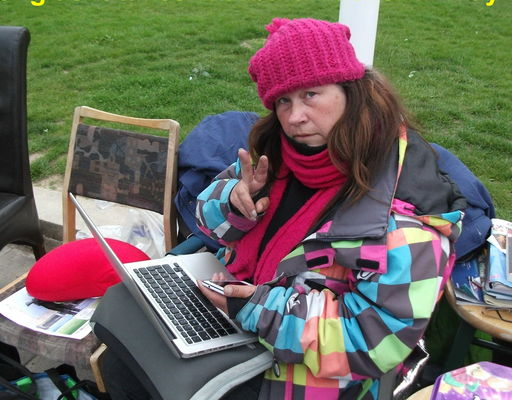
Tucker in London's Parliament Square, March 2012

Barbara Grace Tucker is an Australian born peace activist. She is a native of the Melbourne suburb of Glen Waverley and travelled widely before settling in Britain in the early 1980s.

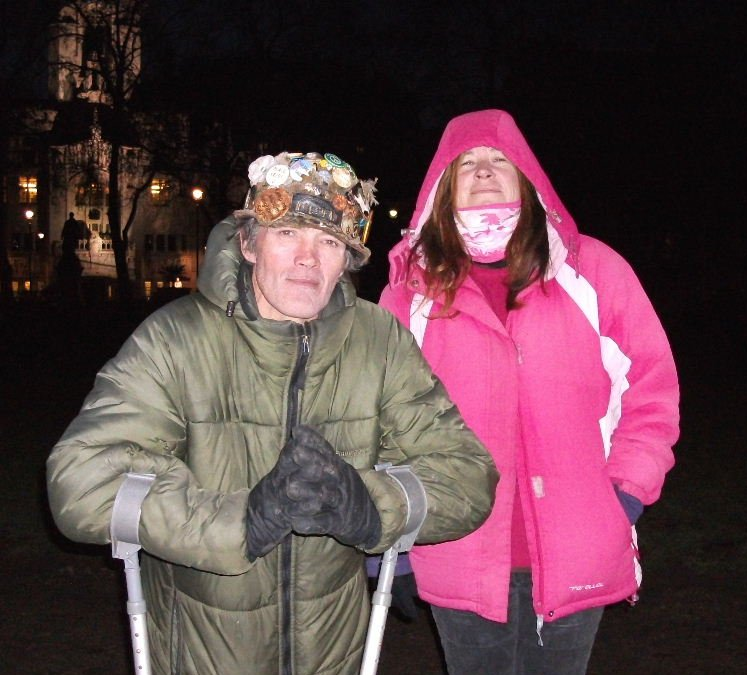
Brian Haw (on crutches) with Barbara Grace Tucker at Christmas 2009

She joined the London Parliament Square Peace Campaign of Brian Haw in December 2005. This round-the-clock campaign had been initiated by Haw in June 2001 to protest the sanctions against Iraq which had devastated Iraqi society and had, according to UNICEF, killed some 500,000 children. In the seven years or so since Tucker's arrival she has been arrested 47 times–usually on charges of "unauthorised demonstration". In 2008 she served two weeks in prison for breach of police bail, and in 2011 she served a nine-week prison sentence in Holloway Prison.

She has been denied a tent, blankets, or sleeping bag since January 2012 and has instead slept in a chair until that, too, was taken away. Tucker has been treated for exposure and has spent some time on an intravenous drip. In January 2013 Tucker started a hunger strike after protesting in the square for a total of eight years. She and her supporters vowed to continue their demonstration, and did so until later in 2013.

== See also ==
- List of peace activists

== Documentaries ==
- Brian & Co. Parliament Square SW1 (by Yumiko Hayakawa)
- Letters from Parliament Square (by Carlos Serrano Azcona)
