= Dwight Watson (farmer) =

American farmer (born 1952)

Dwight Ware Watson (September 28, 1952), dubbed the "Tractor Man" in the media, is a tobacco farmer from Whitakers, North Carolina, who, in March 2003, brought much of Washington, D.C. to a standstill for two days when he drove a tractor into the pond in the Constitution Gardens area of the National Mall and claimed to have explosives. The standoff with federal and local law enforcement ended when Watson surrendered. He was subsequently convicted in federal court of making a false threat to detonate explosives and for destroying federal property, and served 16 months in prison.

== Background ==
Watson was previously an MP with the U.S. Army's 82nd Airborne Division at Fort Bragg. He had increasing difficulty making a living on his 1,200-acre (4.9 km^{2}) tobacco farm in rural Nash County, North Carolina, which had been in his family for five generations. Watson blamed federal tobacco policies for his difficulties, and was said to have engaged in hour-long harangues on this issue at such places as the local grocery store. In 1999, Watson reportedly made his first protest visit to D.C. with his tractor, but left after driving around the city for a while without incident. Following a drought in his state and the cutting of his crop quota by half, Watson finally decided that he was incapable of affording the farm and again drove to D.C. the second weekend of March 2003. (Never Split the Difference, Chapter 10, Chris Voss)

== Standoff ==
External image
- via Evan Vucci, Associated Press
- Dwight Watson waves the American flag at the beginning of his standoff

On March 17, 2003, at around 12:30 p.m. (EST), Watson, wearing a military helmet and displaying an upside down American flag, drove a John Deere tractor towing two vehicles into a shallow pond in Constitution Gardens near the Vietnam Veterans Memorial Wall. Watson said that he was protesting the cutting of federal tobacco subsidies (on which he blamed his own farm's failure) and the government's treatment of Gulf War veterans. According to law enforcement, Watson claimed to have explosives that he would detonate if police approached him.

In response to Watson's threats, the United States Park Police cordoned off a large area on the Mall extending from the Lincoln Memorial to the Washington Monument. Several nearby government offices were also evacuated and major traffic arteries in the area were closed, which caused massive jams and paralyzed traffic across the Washington metropolitan area for four consecutive rush hours.

A SWAT team composed of around 200 FBI and Park Police officers kept the pond surrounded as Watson drove his tractor around in circles, dug up part of an island in the pond, and communicated with authorities and the media on a cell phone. Watson finally surrendered to federal authorities on March 19 after a 48-hour standoff. No explosives were found.

== Trial and sentencing ==
Watson was subsequently charged with the federal crimes of making a false threat to detonate explosives and for destroying federal property, and stood trial in the United States District Court for the District of Columbia. Watson initially represented himself, and unsuccessfully tried to subpoena such figures as Bill Clinton and Jesse Ventura, whom the judge refused as irrelevant to his case. Watson testified at trial that his comments about having an "organophosphate bomb" only referred to the two cans of Raid bug bombs he had in the tractor, which he threatened to use if he did not get media coverage only because he wished to demonstrate the harmfulness of insecticides. In his pretrial interrogation by law enforcement, however, he had acknowledged that he intentionally let law enforcement continue to believe that he actually had explosives. The jury deliberated for less than an hour, and returned a guilty verdict on both charges on September 26, 2003.

Watson's sentencing was repeatedly delayed, particularly for a psychiatric evaluation ordered by the presiding judge, Thomas Penfield Jackson, who questioned Watson's mental health. Judge Jackson finally sentenced Watson to six years, far above the minimum sentence under the federal guidelines of sixteen months, based on what he saw as Watson's menacing conduct and the chaos his standoff had caused, and as a deterrent against civil protesters tying up law enforcement and terrorizing the city. However, following the U.S. Supreme Court's ruling in Blakely v. Washington (2004) that judges could not impose stiffer sentences based on facts that a jury had not decided, Judge Jackson reduced the sentence to sixteen months on June 30, 2004. As Watson had already served over fifteen months by that time, he was released the next day and returned to his family and farm in North Carolina.

Prosecutors challenged the judge's reduction of Watson's sentence, and an appellate court agreed that the reduction was inaccurate and probably too lenient. Nearly four years later, Watson went back to court before District Court Chief Judge Thomas F. Hogan for reconsideration of his sentence on February 12, 2008, which was an uncommon situation for the federal court after a defendant had served his time and had been released. Although he believed Watson deserved another three years in prison, Judge Hogan declined to give Watson more prison time. Noting that it was only the second occasion he had departed from federal sentencing guidelines since Blakely was decided, Hogan stated that there would be little benefit to the public in returning him to prison, particularly since Watson was employed and taking care of his mentally ill sister.

== Reactions ==
The fact that one man had managed to disrupt so much of the nation's capital and hold federal law enforcement officers at bay for two days raised many concerns over the vulnerability of Washington to terrorist attacks, especially coming mere months after the Beltway sniper attacks and coinciding with the build-up to the 2003 invasion of Iraq. Many criticized the authorities for their passive handling of Watson, as he was even left alone to sleep aboard his tractor during the two-day standoff. The Washington Times columnist Tony Blankley wrote that "[o]n the eve of a multi-billion dollar, high-technology war, our security perimeter has been penetrated and downtown traffic has come to a standstill. ... The Park Police should just drag Dwight and his John Deere out of the pond, slap him on the wrist and get ready for the real enemies in our midst." Others argued that the threat of a possible explosion on the Mall required patience and a peaceful resolution.

In a statement issued the same day that Watson surrendered, North Carolina Congressman Bob Etheridge stated that while he did not condone Watson's actions, the farmer personified "the growing pain and frustration felt in tobacco country...We must not miss this opportunity to address the very real problems of tobacco country and rural America." Others, including other farmers in his home state, considered Watson as a patriot who simply used civil disobedience to air legitimate complaints. The Washington Post reported at the time of Watson's sentencing that a "Web site started by tobacco farmers and family members describes Watson as an 'American hero' who called attention to the difficulties of tobacco farmers".

After the Supreme Court's decision in Blakely, the reduction of Watson's sentence was cited by U.S. Senator Orrin Hatch as an example of the "havoc" caused by that decision.

== Popular culture ==
In episode 23 of the American crime drama television series Lie To Me called "Tractor Man", a protesting farmer parks his explosives-packed tractor near the US Treasury building.

The negotiations with Dwight Watson are at the center of one of the classes in negotiation in the MasterClass series by former FBI negotiator Chris Voss.

== See also ==
- Norman Mayer, a nuclear weapons protester who threatened to blow up the Washington Monument in 1982, and was shot and killed by police after a ten-hour standoff
