= Concepción Picciotto =

Spanish peace activist (1936–2016)

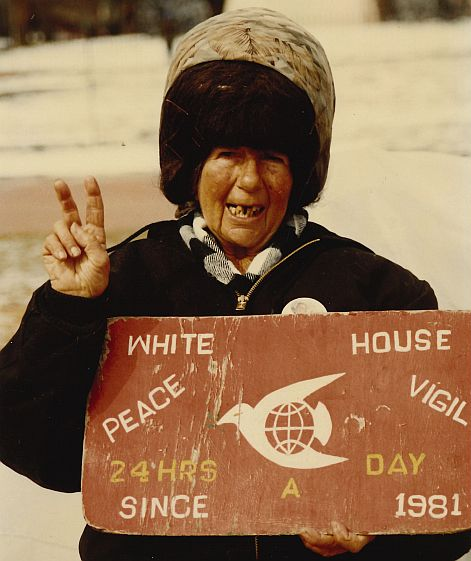
- Picciotto in 1998
- Born: María de la Inmaculada Concepción Martín; 15 January 1936; Vigo, Galicia, Spain
- Died: 25 January 2016 (aged 80); Washington, D.C., U.S.
- Other name: Connie Picciotto
- Known for: Activism

Concepción Picciotto (born María de la Inmaculada Concepción Martín; 15 January 1936 – 25 January 2016), also known as Conchita or Connie, was a Spanish-born, United States–based peace activist. She lived in Lafayette Square, Washington, D.C., on the 1600 block of Pennsylvania Avenue, in a peace camp across from the White House, from 1 August 1981 in protest of nuclear arms until her death.

Picciotto carried on the longest continuous act of political protest in the United States, with her camp having been nicknamed by her supporters as "1601 Pennsylvania Avenue".

Eleanor Holmes Norton, D.C.'s delegate to the House of Representatives, noted that many of Picciotto's goals were accomplished during her protest, including a reduction in atomic proliferation.

== Life ==
Picciotto claimed to have been orphaned in Spain and raised by a grandmother. After emigrating to the United States in 1960, she worked as a receptionist for a Spanish government commercial attaché in New York. She married an Italian immigrant (whose forename is unknown) and lived in the Gravesend section of Brooklyn, New York. She reportedly adopted an infant daughter, Olga, in Argentina in 1973.

Picciotto was inspired by fellow activist William Thomas (died 23 January 2009), who originally began the White House Peace Vigil on 3 June 1981. They began protesting on the sidewalk by the White House fence. National Park Service rules moved them across Pennsylvania Avenue. She was sentenced to 90 days for violating rules. They are moved for inaugural parades.

During her life she was assisted by members of Occupy Peace House where she resided.

She was reported to be in discussions with Ellen Thomas to remain in the Peace House, a house in Washington D.C. which Thomas had inherited from her husband, William Thomas.

== Death ==
Concepcion Picciotto in 2012

Picciotto died on 25 January 2016, 10 days after her 80th birthday, at N Street Village, a non-profit organization that supports homeless women in Washington. The cause of death was not immediately known but she experienced a fall moments before her death.

== Appearances ==
Picciotto was featured in Michael Moore's 2004 film, Fahrenheit 9/11. The Oracles of Pennsylvania Avenue (2012) by Tim Wilkerson, a documentary commissioned by the Al Jazeera Documentary Channel, recounts the life of Picciotto, William and Ellen Thomas, and Norman Mayer.

== See also ==
- List of peace activists
- Brian Haw, an English protester who lived in a similar peace camp in Parliament Square, London for a decade, from 2001 until his death in 2011
- Gino Strada, an Italian protester and doctor, who founded Emergency, a non-governmental organization to save human lives around the world.
