= White House Peace Vigil =

Anti-war protest starting in 1981

Coordinates: 38°53′56.11″N 77°02′11.59″W

The White House Peace Vigil
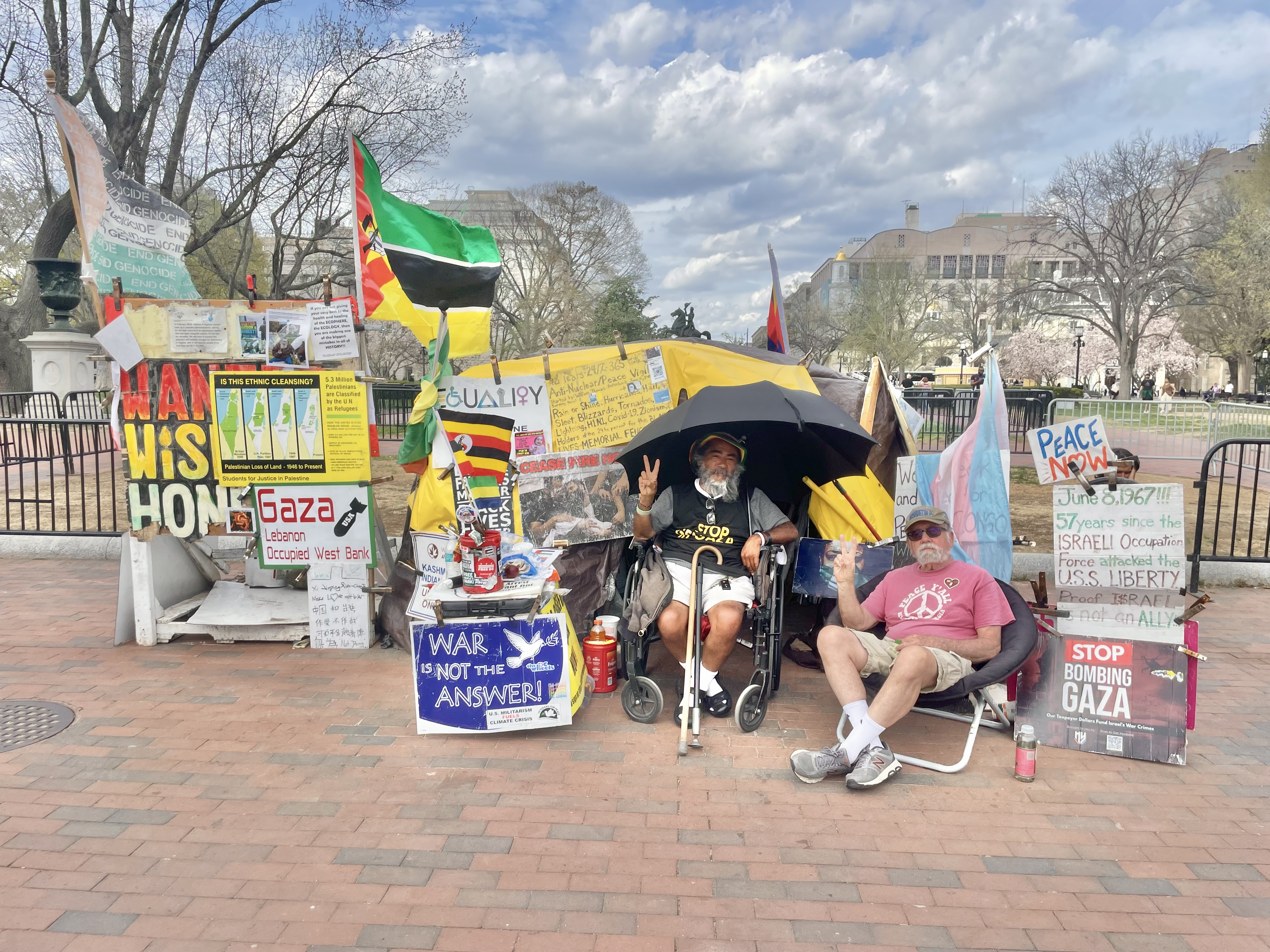
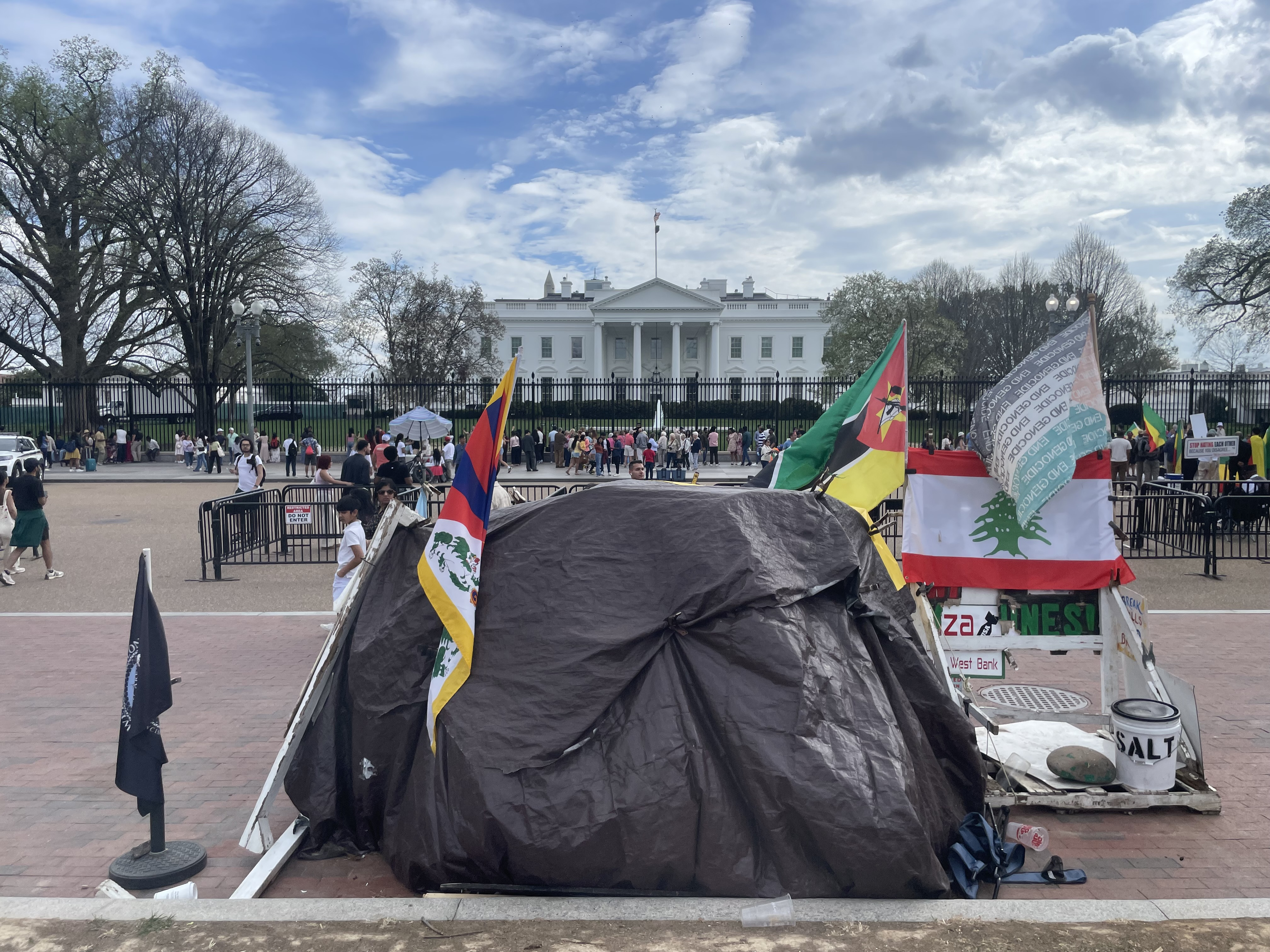
- The Vigil, staffed by volunteers Philipos Melaku-Bello (left) and Joe Brown (right), with Lafayette Square in the background, March 2025. The Vigil facing the White House, March 2025.
- Start date: June 3, 1981
- Duration: 45 years and 1 month
- Location: Lafayette Square, Washington, D.C., United States
- Cause: Anti-war protest and peace vigil
- Organisers: Philipos Melaku-Bello (2016–present); Concepción Picciotto (2009–2016); William Thomas (1981–2009)

The White House Peace Vigil is an ongoing protest calling for global nuclear disarmament and world peace, located directly across from the United States White House, which has demonstrated continuously since 1981. Volunteers staff the vigil 24/7 and it is widely considered to be the longest continuous act of political protest in U.S. history.

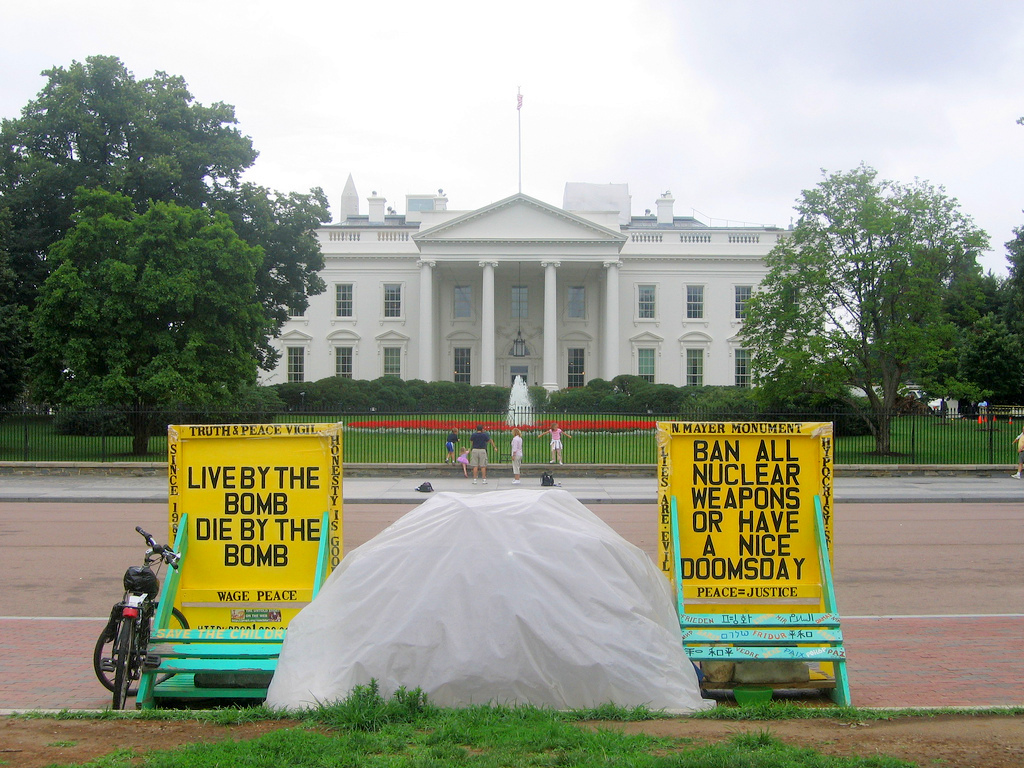
The White House Peace Vigil, June 2006

== History ==
The vigil was launched by activist William Thomas as an anti-nuclear weapons protest outside the White House in Lafayette Square, Washington, D.C. on June 3, 1981. He was later joined by Concepción Picciotto in August 1981 and Ellen Thomas (née Benjamin), who he later wed, in April 1984. Over the years various other activists have joined, including those from the Catholic Worker Movement, Plowshares Movement and Occupy D.C.

After Thomas's death in 2009, the vigil was maintained around-the-clock by Concepción Picciotto and many other volunteers until her death in 2016. Since this time, Philipos Melaku-Bello has led the vigil, which must be staffed at all times in order to avoid being dismantled by authorities. Many dedicated volunteers such as Melaku-Bello dedicate 40 hours per week or more to the vigil. Activist Jay Marx was one such volunteer who toured with Ellen Thomas to promote the Proposition One Campaign for a Nuclear-Free Future.

The vigil continued to be staffed by activists during Hurricane Sandy in 2012. In 2013, the Peace Vigil was disassembled while it was briefly left unattended. It was restored the same day and organizers said that the responsible volunteer was a veteran who had experienced a bout of post-traumatic stress disorder.

In May 2025, Republican Representative Jeff Van Drew wrote a letter to Secretary of the Interior Doug Burgum describing it as a "24/7 eyesore" and requesting its removal. During a press conference with President Trump in the Oval Office on September 5, 2025, Brian Glenn, a reporter from right-wing media outlet Real America's Voice, called the vigil "anti-American", and an "eyesore". In response, President Trump stated he had not previously known of the vigil and ordered staffers in the room to remove it. At approximately 6:30 AM on September 7, 2025 federal agents removed the vigil's tarp-covered tent-like structure and temporarily detained and handcuffed the volunteer on duty who attempted to intervene. The vigil itself, complete with protest placards, signs, and flags, remained physically present and staffed throughout the confrontation. The vigil was fully reassembled within a few hours.

== Influence ==
Thomas and the White House Peace Vigil inspired U.S. House of Representatives Delegate Eleanor Holmes Norton to introduce the Nuclear Disarmament and Economic Conversion Act, that would require the United States to disable and dismantle its nuclear weapons when all other nations possessing nuclear weapons do likewise. The Congresswoman has been introducing a version of the bill since 1994.

== In the media ==
The Oracles of Pennsylvania Avenue, a 2012 documentary directed by Tim Wilkerson and commissioned by the Al Jazeera Documentary Channel, recounts the lives of anti-nuclear activists Thomas, Concepción Picciotto and Norman Mayer.

== See also ==
- Countdown to Zero, 2010 documentary
- Parliament Square Peace Campaign
- Brian Haw
- List of peace activists

=== Other long-running protests ===
- Aboriginal Tent Embassy (Australia, ongoing continuously since January 26, 1972)
- Madres de Plaza de Mayo (Argentina, ongoing every Thursday since April 30, 1977)
- Faslane Peace Camp (Scotland, ongoing continuously since 1982)
- Wednesday demonstration (South Korea, ongoing every Wednesday since January 8, 1992)
