= Thomas (activist) =

American peace activist (1947–2009)

William Thomas
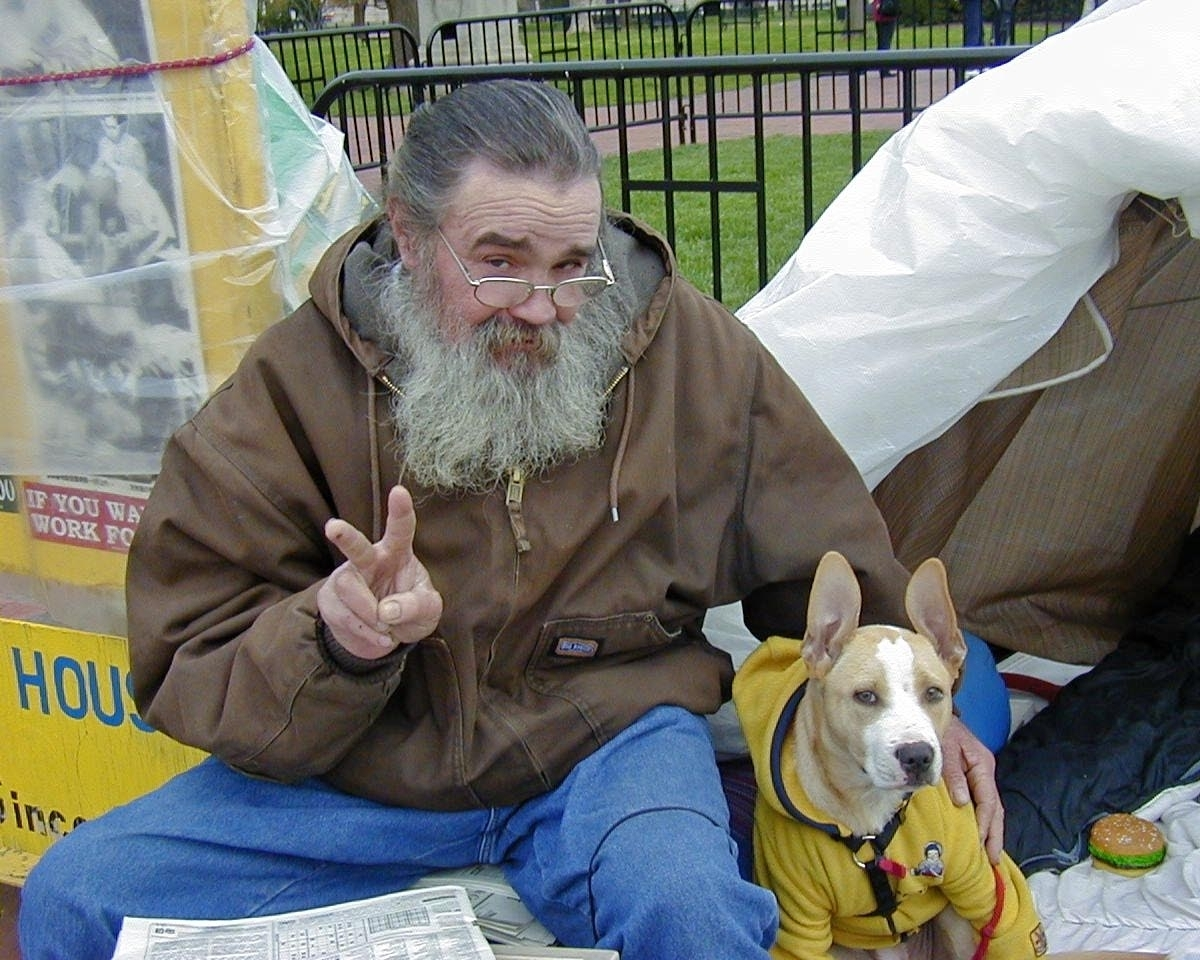
- Thomas with his dog Sophie
- Born: William Thomas Hallenback Jr. March 20, 1947; Tarrytown, New York, US
- Died: January 23, 2009 (aged 61)
- Occupation: Anti-nuclear activist
- Spouse: Ellen Benjamin (m. 1984)

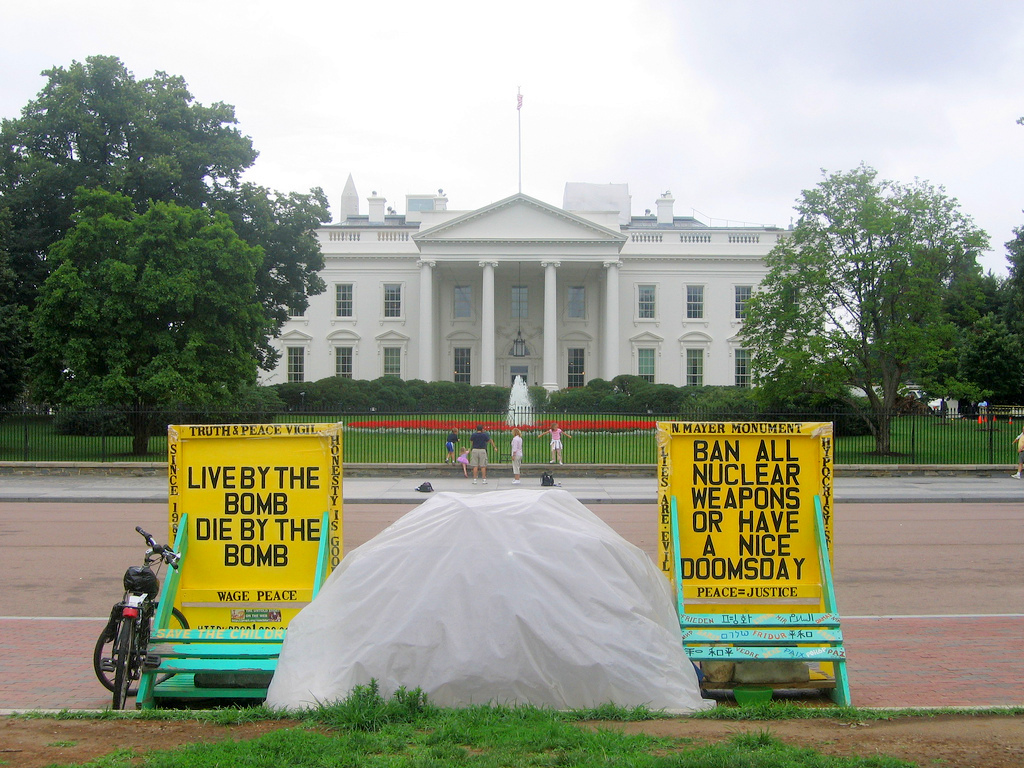
Thomas started the White House Peace Vigil, the longest-running peace vigil in US history, in 1981.

William Thomas Hallenback Jr., known as Thomas (March 20, 1947 – January 23, 2009), was an American anti-nuclear activist and simple-living adherent who undertook a 27-year peace vigil – the longest recorded vigil in US history at the time, with the title passing to his co-protester Concepción Picciotto after Thomas' death – in front of the White House.

== Biography ==
Thomas was born in Tarrytown, New York, and became a truck driver, jewelry maker, and carpenter. Inspired by the Sermon on the Mount, he became a pilgrim and began traveling the world in the interest of world peace.

In 1978, having tried to swim across the Suez Canal on his way to Israel, Thomas spent eight months in an Egyptian prison. Later, in response to United States foreign policy, he destroyed his passport while trying to renounce his American citizenship in London. In 1980, the British authorities deported him to the United States.

In 1981, Thomas traveled to Washington, D.C., and spent several months at the Community for Creative Non-Violence, founded by J. Edward Guinan, when Mitch Snyder was living there. On June 3, he launched the White House Peace Vigil in Lafayette Square. In August 1981, he was joined by Concepción Picciotto. In April 1984, Ellen Benjamin joined him. On May 6, 1984, Thomas and Ellen were married at a Quaker wedding.

During the first three years of the vigil, the Park Police arrested Thomas sixteen times. The charges ranged from illegal camping to disorderly conduct. In subsequent years, Thomas and Ellen protested with numerous other activists, including representatives from the Catholic Worker and Plowshares movements.

Thomas died on January 23, 2009, aged 61, of pulmonary disease.

== Legacy ==
Thomas and the White House Peace Vigil inspired Delegate Eleanor Holmes Norton to introduce the Nuclear Disarmament and Economic Conversion Act to Congress in 1994. It would require the United States to disable and dismantle its nuclear weapons – once all other nations possessing nuclear weapons did likewise – and redirect the funds saved into renewable energy and social projects.

Since 1994, Norton has continued to introduce revised or renewed versions of the bill. In March 2011, for example, following the Fukushima Daiichi nuclear disaster in Japan, it was reintroduced under the name of the "Nuclear Weapons Abolition and Economic and Energy Conversion Act".

The Oracles of Pennsylvania Avenue, a 2012 TV documentary commissioned by the Al Jazeera Documentary Channel, recounts the lives of Thomas, Ellen, Concepcion Picciotto and Norman Mayer.

== See also ==
- Brian Haw
- Christian anarchism
- Christian pacifism
- Ed Grothus
- List of peace activists
