= Beef war =

Beef war or beef wars may refer to:

- Beef hormone controversy or Beef War
- Beef war, the ban on British beef associated with mad cow disease
- Beef war, the conflict about United States beef imports in Taiwan

== See also ==
- United States beef imports in Japan
- United States beef imports in South Korea
- 2008 US beef protest in South Korea
