= The Hankyoreh =

South Korean daily newspaper

Hankyoreh

- Cover of Hankyoreh
- Type: Daily newspaper
- Format: Broadsheet (weekday); Tabloid (Saturday)
- Owner: Hankyoreh Media Group
- Publisher: Choi Woo-seong
- Editor: Kim Young-hee
- Founded: May 15, 1988; 38 years ago (as Hankyoreh Shinmun)
- Political alignment: Centre-left; Liberalism; Factions: Progressivism
- Headquarters: Mapo-gu, Seoul
- Website: www.hani.co.kr

Korean name
- Hangul: 한겨레
- Lit.: The Korean Nation; One Nation
- RR: Hangyeore
- MR: Han'gyŏre
- IPA: han.ɡjʌ.ɾe

The Hankyoreh (Korean: 한겨레; lit. 'The Korean Nation; One Nation') is a centre-left liberal daily newspaper in South Korea. It was established in 1988 after widespread purges forced out dissident journalists, and was envisioned as an alternative to existing newspapers, which were regarded as unduly influenced by the authoritarian government at the time. When it launched, it claimed to be "the first newspaper in the world truly independent of political power and large capital." As of 2016, it has been voted as the most trusted news organization by Korean journalists for nine consecutive years but is also the least influential news outlet by the survey. It has online editions in English, Chinese, and Japanese.

== History ==
The newspaper was originally established as Hankyoreh Shinmun (한겨레신문) on 15 May 1988 by ex-journalists from The Dong-A Ilbo and The Chosun Ilbo. At the time, government censors were in every newsroom, newspaper content was virtually dictated by the Ministry of Culture and Information, and newspapers had nearly the same articles on every page. The Hankyoreh was intended to provide an independent, left-leaning and liberal-nationalist alternative to mainstream newspapers regarded as blindly pro-business and opposed to national reunification. To underscore its patriotism and its break with tradition, The Hankyoreh became the first daily to completely reject the use of Hanja and use only Hangul; it continues to make only limited use of the Latin alphabet and limits the use of loanwords. It was also the first newspaper in Korea to be printed horizontally instead of vertically.

== Stances on political issues ==
=== Between nationalism and internationalism ===
The Hankyoreh is the most critical of Japan among major South Korean media outlets. On October 7, 2016, it published article arguing that South Korea's anti-Japanese and Japan's anti-Korean sentiments were completely different, and that it was wrong to conflate the two. In particular, the newspaper argues that Korea's anti-Japan sentiment does not lead to hate crimes against the Japanese, and is a legitimate emotion of the country. However, the newspaper has criticized xenophobia against the Japanese living in Korea. The Hankyoreh is known as the most pro-European media in South Korea. When Britain decided on Brexit, The Hankyoreh criticized Britain's move.

On the conflictual nature of the territorial sovereignty of the Liancourt Rocks (Dokdo in Korean, Takeshima in Japanese), although exceeded by The Chosun Ilbo in its coverage, The Hankyoreh's coverage has been described in "A Comparative Analysis of News Coverage of Dokdo Island" by Yoon Youngchul and E. Gwangho as reflecting the foreign policy interest of South Korea versus Japan.

In line with the newspaper's nationalism and aspirations for reunification, its reporting of inter-Korean and East Asian affairs is based on its editorial policy seeking reconciliation, stability and peaceful co-prosperity through dialogue rather than pressure on the government of North Korea. In terms of national affairs, studies on the editorial policies of South Korean newspapers by Cheongwadae, the Office of the President, have found that The Hankyoreh, which published its first issue early in the Roh Tae-woo administration, has shown little fluctuation from administration to administration. The Hankyoreh also runs a "Hankyoreh Foundation for Reunification and Culture" as a forum for advocacy of peace and reunification on the Korean peninsula. Notwithstanding the newspaper's support for democracy, human rights, and free speech in South Korea, in June 2009, The Hankyoreh described the arrest and imprisonment of two US journalists in North Korea, condemned by Reporters Without Borders, as a sham trial, as a "not entirely negative signal" of North Korea's openness to communicate.

=== Liberalism and supporting human rights ===
Other legacies of its early dissident history include a strong emphasis on human rights in South Korea, a position it continues to hold today, together with several international organizations that have criticized South Korea for its retreat from democracy, human rights and press freedom. The Hankyoreh's advocacy of human rights also extends to North Koreans and tends to support normalization of relations with the U.S. It has been critical of approaches towards improving the situation by encouraging system collapse through absorption by South Korea or by encouraging defections.

The Hankyoreh opposes censorship and wiretapping and encourages active debate on news that is circulated, and like many newspapers in South Korea, is opposed to circulation of graphic news content and took a strong stance in the instance of the video footage of Kim Sun-il's death in Iraq. It strongly endorsed the 2008 "mad cow protests" as a victory for "substantive democracy" over merely "procedural democracy." It strongly encouraged coverage of the 2008 demonstrations and a greater understanding of "candlelight spirit" that academics are referring to as an emergence of a new social movement and form of democracy in South Korea that protests policy development on trade, liberalization of public education, the privatization of health, and the environmental consequences of a cross-country canal project without substantial public opinion gathering.

The Hankyoreh has campaigned for higher standards of ethics in journalism since its founding and had initiated a campaign against journalists' taking bribes, which had been customary in the industry in South Korea until the late 1990s.

The Hankyoreh has a fairly favorable view of feminism, LGBT rights, opposes discrimination against ethnic minorities and supports political correctness. However, some editorials criticized political correctness. The Hankyoreh shows a favorable tone for the Democratic Party of Korea, but opposes their somewhat socially conservative approach to LGBT rights.

=== Economic and labor propensity ===
The Hankyoreh has been critical of Korean big business and conglomerates that overwhelm the market, of the Korean university entrance system, and of widening income disparities in Korean society, while maintaining a generally favourable attitude towards organised labour and the redistribution of income.

The Hankyoreh supported protectionism in the early days of its foundation, but it is now closer to supporting free trade. In 2022, The Hankyoreh described Joe Biden's protectionist policy negatively, referring to the reactions of experts and European countries, and pointed out that it was 'economic nationalism' (경제적 민족주의), similar to that of Donald Trump.

The Hankyoreh departed from established convention by relying more on sales, periodic private donation campaigns, and the sale of stock, rather than on advertising from major corporations, to sustain itself. The newspaper currently has more than 60,000 citizen shareholders, none of whom holds more than a one per cent share. Core shareholders include students, professors, lawyers, writers, liberals, and urban industrial workers. The company remains intentionally unlisted to avoid a hostile takeover; it has also never shown three consecutive years of profit, one of the requirements for listing. Readership of the newspaper is evenly distributed between the provinces and the major metropolitan areas; of its readers, 63.2% were in their twenties and thirties, and 44.5% were college graduates. The Hankyoreh's readership is mostly of low to middle-class income.

=== Criticism of mainstream conservatism ===
After three decades in print, its circulation of about 600,000 readers puts it at one third the size of any of the three major dailies (The Chosun Ilbo, JoongAng Ilbo, and The Dong-a Ilbo), though still ahead of specialist economic dailies. It is the fourth largest newspaper in Korea. The Hankyoreh's editorial content consists of strident criticism of the three major newspapers. It has also endorsed boycott campaigns of companies that advertise in its competitors.

In 2009, The Hankyoreh joined Amnesty International, the Broadcaster Producers Association of Korea, and other civic groups in expressing concern over the atypical behavior exhibited by prosecutors in the detention of Korean TV channel MBC journalists and the attack on press freedom in South Korea. Although there has been controversy over distortions in MBC's reporting on US beef imports, the arrest of journalists and the continued persecution of the press have been primary concerns for The Hankyoreh and other international journalist organizations.

=== Climate and environmental stances ===
In April 2020, The Hankyoreh became the first mainstream paper in Korea to establish a newsroom team dedicated to climate change. The climate section is called "ClimateChange&" and covers topics such as nuclear power, environmental and ecological destruction, endangered and at-risk species, and green pledges. The paper has been critical of nuclear power for safety concerns, and has published multiple editorials condemning Japan for its plans to release treated water from the Fukushima nuclear catastrophe into the ocean.

The paper's series "Climate Crisis and Human Rights" earned it the Journalists Association of Korea and National Human Rights Commission of Korea's 11th annual "Human Rights Reporting Prize" in 2022, with the selection committee stating it had "highly appraised the series' on-the-ground coverage of lives uprooted by climate change, which shows that the climate crisis is ultimately an issue of inequality and justice, and its ability to unravel the climate crisis from the perspective of human rights."

=== Other ===
In 2014, it partnered with a comic artists union, Toonion, to create a global creative content company called RollingStory, which launched an online sharing platform, Spottoon, for South Korean digital comics in 2015.

== Hankyoreh Media Group ==
- Cine 21
- HuffPost Korea (joint venture with HuffPost News, a division of BuzzFeed)
- Hankyoreh Education
- Hankyoreh Book Publishing (HaniBook)

== See also ==
- Media of South Korea
- Liberalism in South Korea
- List of newspapers in South Korea
- Culture of South Korea
- Democratic Party of Korea
- Justice Party (South Korea)
- Korean nationalism
- 386 Generation
- Gangnam leftist
