= Anti-nuclear protests =

Protests in opposition of nuclear power or nuclear weapons

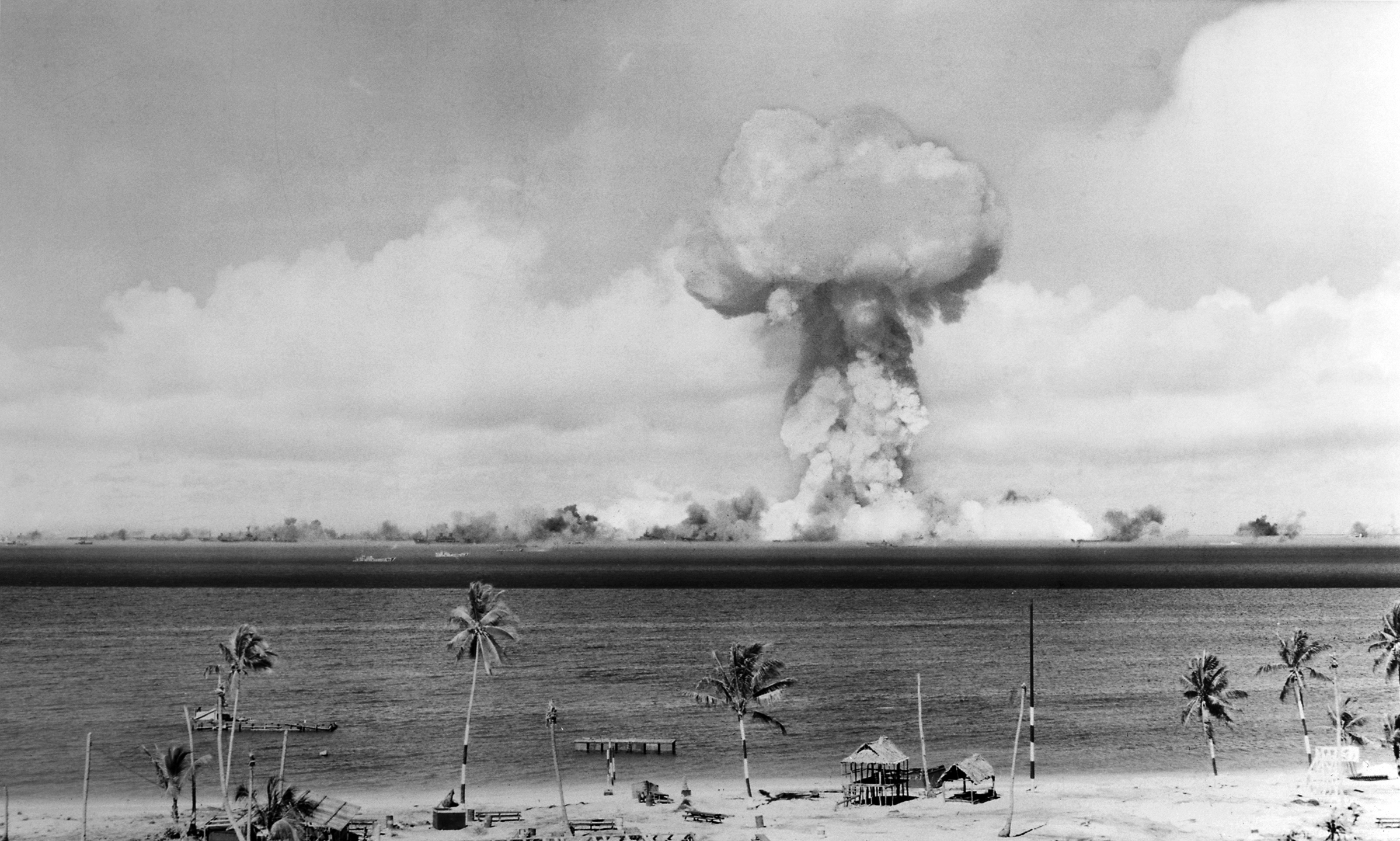
Operation Crossroads Test Able, a 23-kiloton air-deployed nuclear weapon detonated on July 1, 1946. This bomb used, and consumed, the infamous Demon core that took the lives of two scientists in two separate criticality accidents.

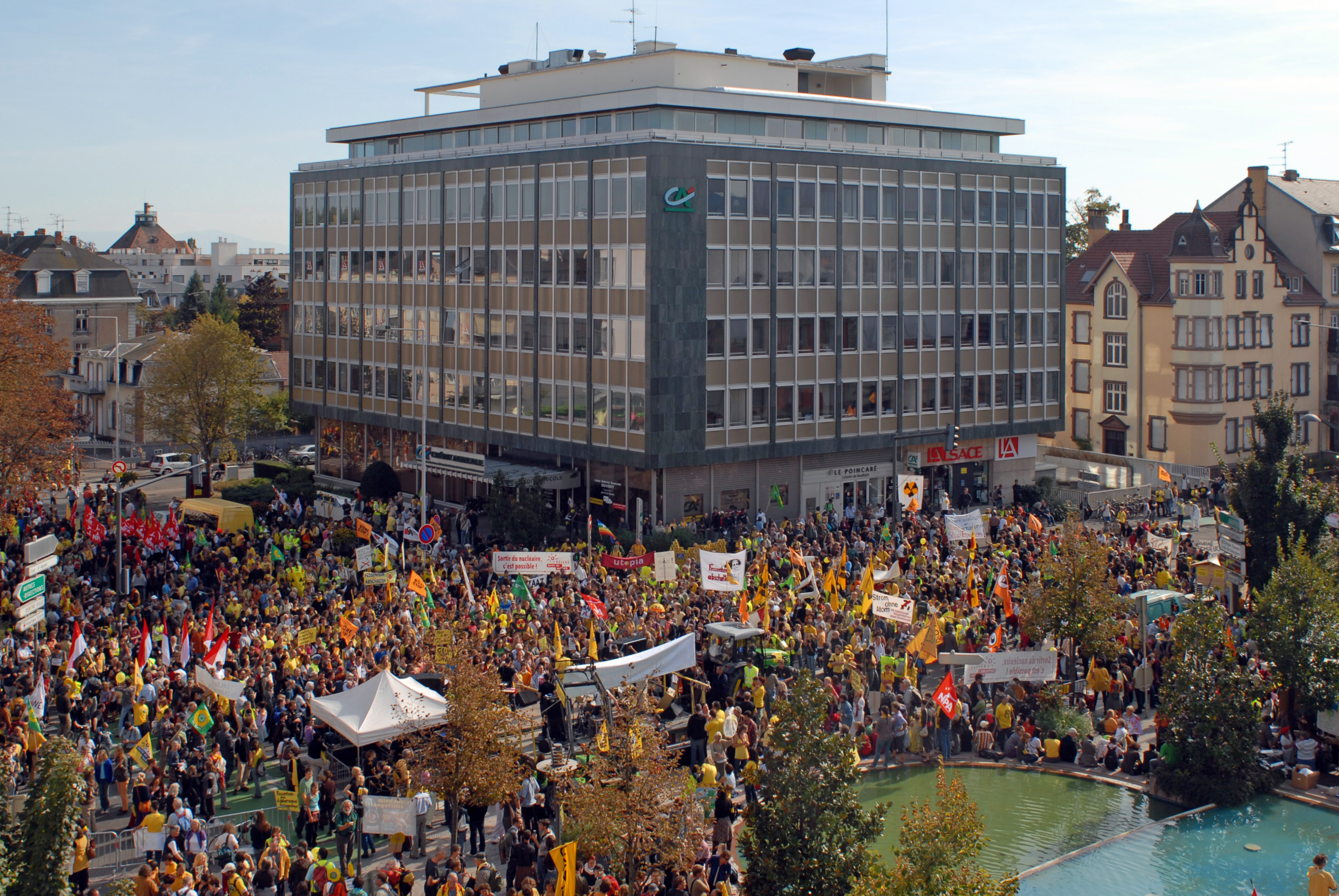
Anti-nuclear demonstration in Colmar, north-eastern France, on October 3, 2009.

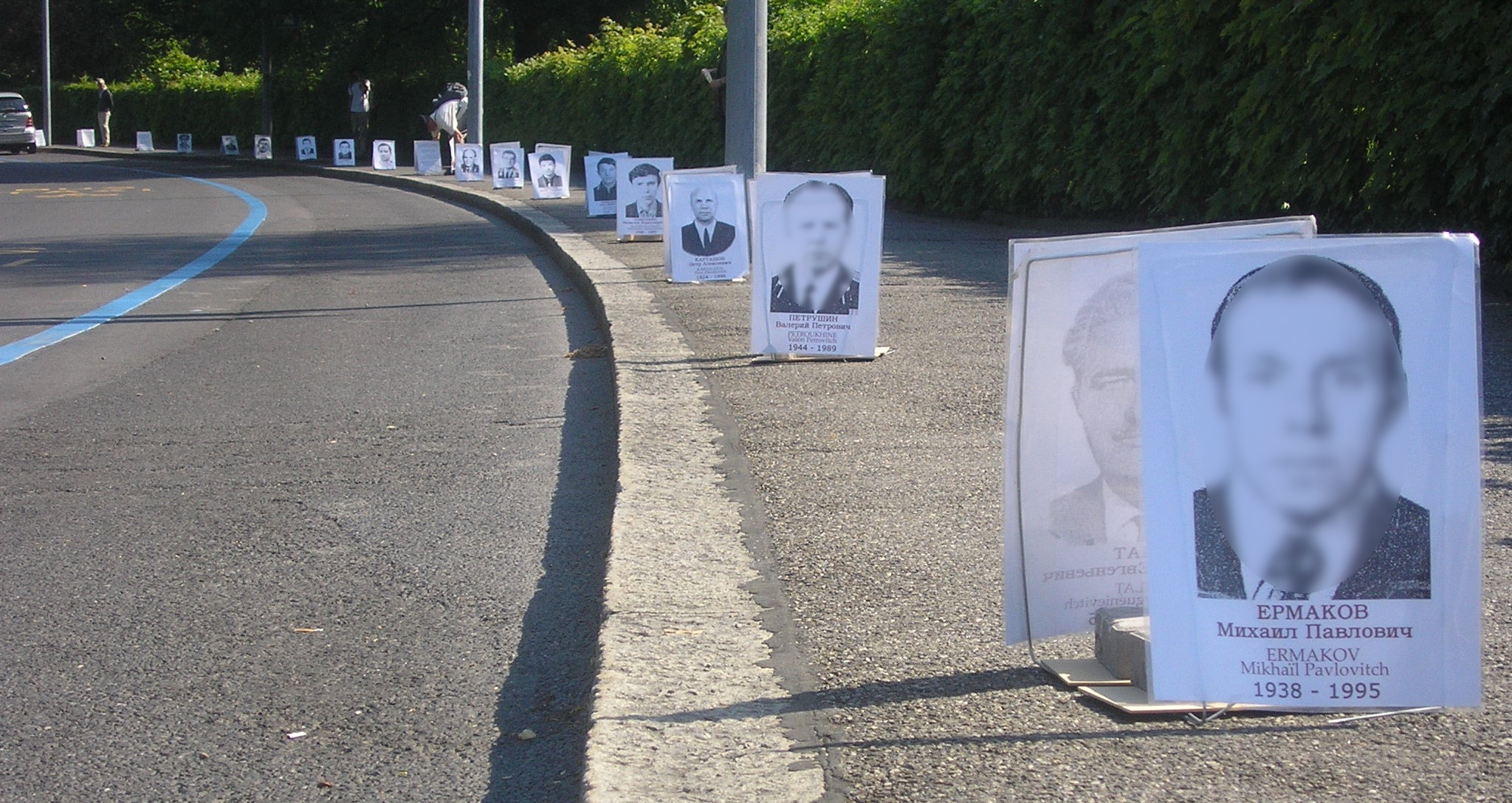
Deceased Liquidators' portraits used for an anti-nuclear power protest in Geneva.

Anti-nuclear protests began on a small scale in the U.S. as early as 1946 in response to Operation Crossroads. Large scale anti-nuclear protests first emerged in the mid-1950s in Japan in the wake of the March 1954 Lucky Dragon Incident. August 1955 saw the first meeting of the World Conference against Atomic and Hydrogen Bombs, which had around 3,000 participants from Japan and other nations. Protests began in Britain in the late 1950s and early 1960s. In the United Kingdom, the first Aldermaston March, organised by the Campaign for Nuclear Disarmament, took place in 1958. In 1961, at the height of the Cold War, about 50,000 women brought together by Women Strike for Peace marched in 60 cities in the United States to demonstrate against nuclear weapons. In 1964, Peace Marches in several Australian capital cities featured "Ban the Bomb" placards.

Nuclear power became an issue of major public protest in the 1970s and demonstrations in France and West Germany began in 1971. In France, between 1975 and 1977, some 175,000 people protested against nuclear power in ten demonstrations. In West Germany, between February 1975 and April 1979, some 280,000 people were involved in seven demonstrations at nuclear sites. Many mass demonstrations took place in the aftermath of the 1979 Three Mile Island accident and a New York City protest in September 1979 involved two hundred thousand people. Some 120,000 people demonstrated against nuclear power in Bonn, in October 1979. In May 1986, following the Chernobyl disaster, an estimated 150,000 to 200,000 people marched in Rome to protest against the Italian nuclear program, and clashes between anti-nuclear protesters and police became common in West Germany.

In the early 1980s, the revival of the nuclear arms race triggered large protests about nuclear weapons. In October 1981 half a million people took to the streets in several cities in Italy, more than 250,000 people protested in Bonn, 250,000 demonstrated in London, and 100,000 marched in Brussels. The largest anti-nuclear protest was held on June 12, 1982, when one million people demonstrated in New York City against nuclear weapons. In October 1983, nearly 3 million people across western Europe protested nuclear missile deployments and demanded an end to the arms race; the largest crowd of almost one million people assembled in the Hague in the Netherlands. In Britain, 400,000 people participated in what was probably the largest demonstration in British history.

On May 1, 2005, 40,000 anti-nuclear/anti-war protesters marched past the United Nations in New York, 60 years after the atomic bombings of Hiroshima and Nagasaki. This was the largest anti-nuclear rally in the U.S. for several decades. In 2005 in Britain, there were many protests about the government's proposal to replace the aging Trident weapons system with a newer model. The largest protest had 100,000 participants. In May 2010, some 25,000 people, including members of peace organizations and 1945 atomic bomb survivors, marched from Lower Manhattan to the United Nations headquarters, calling for the elimination of nuclear weapons.

The 2011 Japanese nuclear accidents undermined the nuclear power industry's proposed renaissance and revived anti-nuclear passions worldwide, putting governments on the defensive. There were large protests in Germany, India, Japan, Switzerland, and Taiwan.

== Australia and the Pacific ==
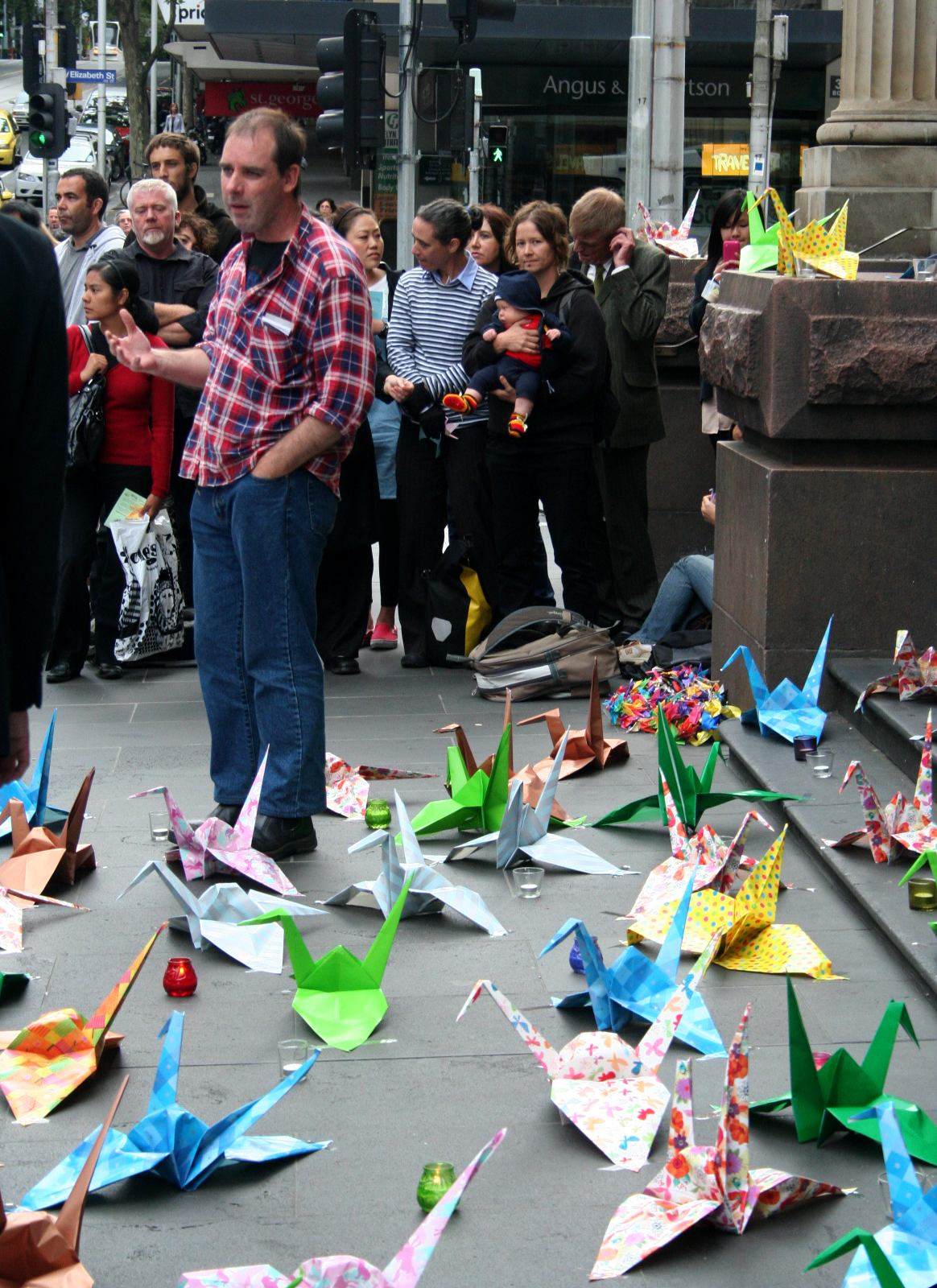
Australian anti-nuclear campaigner Jim Green at Melbourne's GPO in March 2011.

In 1964, Peace Marches which featured "Ban the bomb" placards, were held in several Australian capital cities.

In 1972, the anti-nuclear weapons movement maintained a presence in the Pacific, largely in response to French nuclear testing there. Activists, including David McTaggart from Greenpeace, defied the French government by sailing small vessels into the test zone and interrupting the testing program. In Australia, thousands joined protest marches in Adelaide, Melbourne, Brisbane, and Sydney. Scientists issued statements demanding an end to the tests; unions refused to load French ships, service French planes, or carry French mail; and consumers boycotted French products. In Fiji, activists formed an Against Testing on Mururoa organization.

In November and December 1976, 7,000 people marched through the streets of Australian cities, protesting against uranium mining. The Uranium Moratorium group was formed and it called for a five-year moratorium on uranium mining. In April 1977 the first national demonstration co-ordinated by the Uranium Moratorium brought around 15,000 demonstrators into the streets of Melbourne, 5,000 in Sydney, and smaller numbers elsewhere. A National signature campaign attracted over 250,000 signatures calling for a five-year moratorium. In August, another demonstration brought 50,000 people out nationally and the opposition to uranium mining looked like a potential political force. Smaller protests in the late 1970s included blockades of wharves where yellowcake was being loaded onto ships.

On Palm Sunday 1982, an estimated 100,000 Australians participated in anti-nuclear rallies in the nation's largest cities. Growing year by year, the rallies drew 350,000 participants in 1985. The movement focused on halting Australia's uranium mining and exports, abolishing nuclear weapons, removing foreign military bases from Australia's soil, and creating a nuclear-free Pacific. During the early to mid 1980s a number of visits by potentially nuclear armed and powered US warships were made subject to protests and on board occupations.

In 1998 an eight month blockade disrupted construction work on the proposed Jabiluka uranium mine. As part of a campaign led by the Mirrar people, this helped lead to the project being canceled.

On Dec 17th 2001, 46 Greenpeace activists occupied the Lucas Heights facility to protest the construction of a second research reactor. Protestors gained access to the grounds, the HIFAR reactor, the high-level radioactive waste store and the radio tower. Their protest highlighted the security and environmental risks of the production of nuclear materials and the shipment of radioactive waste from the facility.

In March 2012, hundreds of anti-nuclear demonstrators converged on the Australian headquarters of global mining giants BHP Billiton and Rio Tinto to mark one year since the Fukushima nuclear disaster. The 500-strong march through southern Melbourne called for an end to uranium mining in Australia. There were also events in Sydney, and in Melbourne the protest included speeches and performances by representatives of the expatriate Japanese community as well as Australia's Indigenous communities, who are worried about the effects of uranium mining near tribal lands.

== Czech Republic ==
As early as 1993 there were local and international protests against the Temelin Nuclear Power Plant's construction. Large grassroots civil disobedience actions took place in 1996 and 1997. These were organized by the so-called Clean Energy Brigades. In September and October 2000, Austrian anti-nuclear protesters demonstrated against the Temelin Nuclear Power Plant and at one stage temporarily blocked all 26 border crossings between Austria and the Czech Republic. The first reactor was finally commissioned in 2000 and the second in 2002.

== France ==
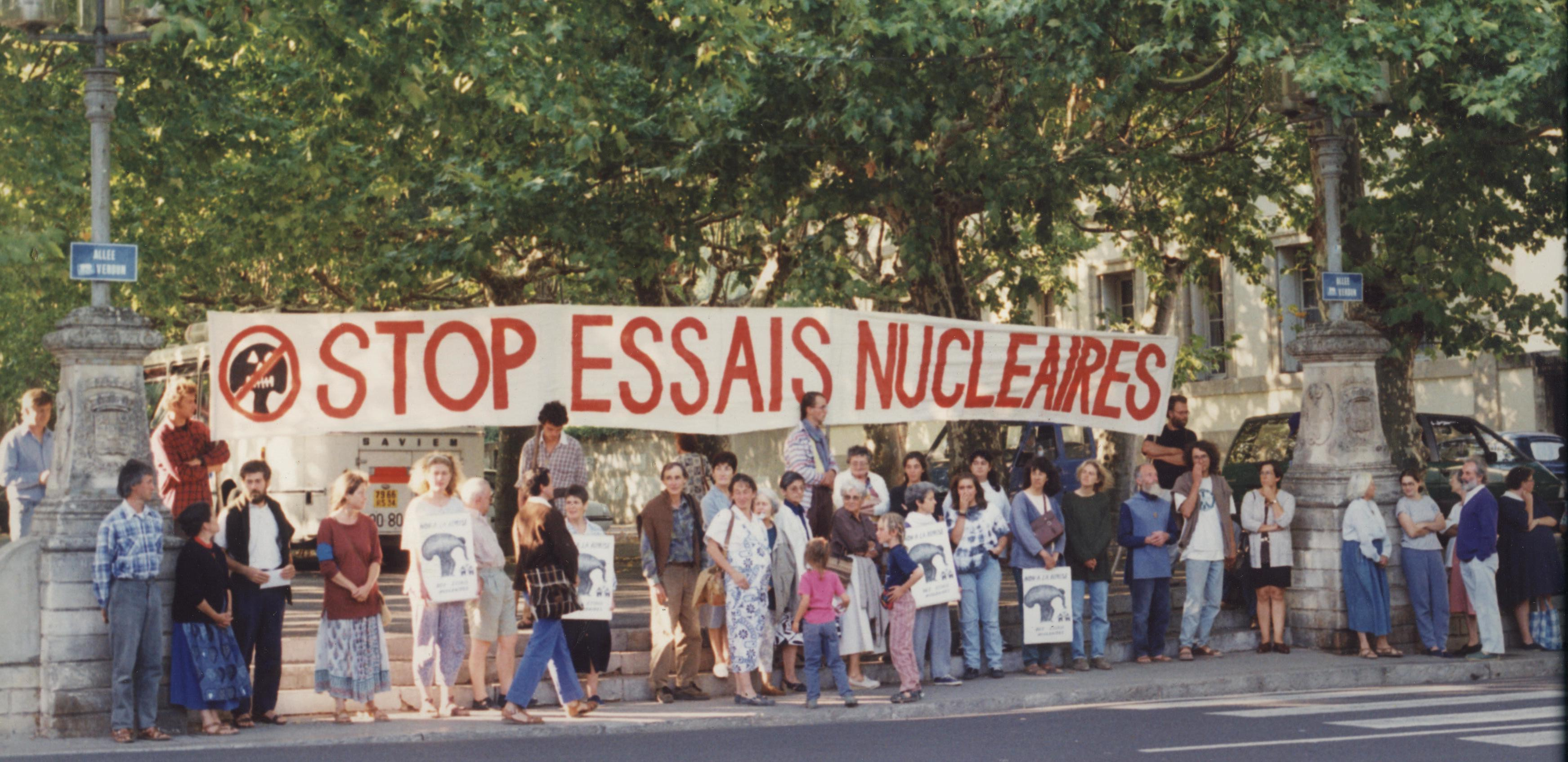
Demonstration against nuclear tests in Lyon, France, in the 1980s.

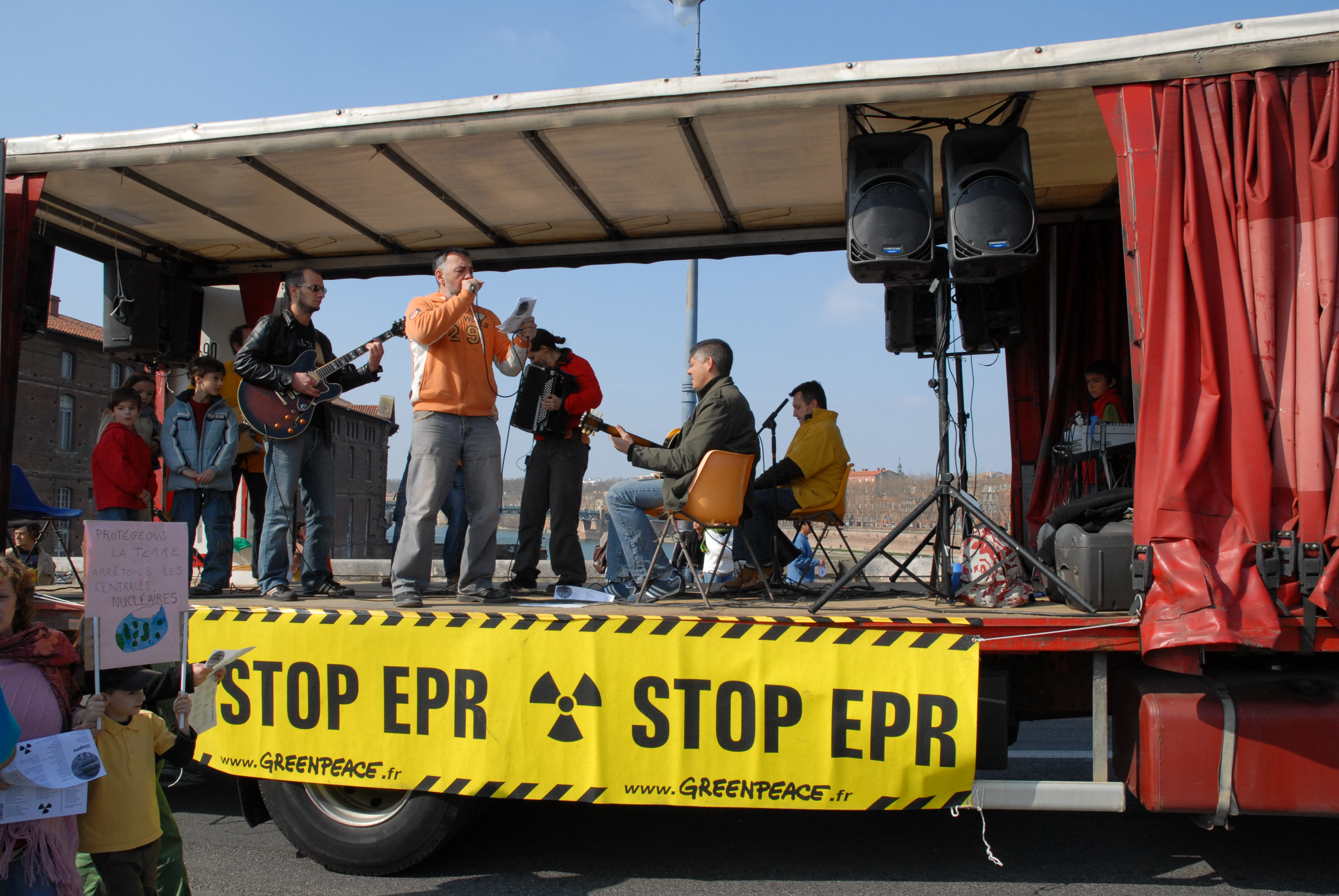
A scene from the 2007 Stop EPR (European Pressurised Reactor) protest in Toulouse, France.

In 1971, 15,000 people demonstrated against French plans to locate the first light-water reactor power plant in Bugey. This was the first of a series of mass protests organized at nearly every planned nuclear site in France until the massive demonstration at the Superphénix breeder reactor in Creys-Malvillein in 1977 culminated in violence.

In France, between 1975 and 1977, some 175,000 people protested against nuclear power in ten demonstrations.

In January 2004, up to 15,000 anti-nuclear protesters marched in Paris against a new generation of nuclear reactors, the European Pressurised Water Reactor (EPWR).

On March 17, 2007, simultaneous protests, organised by Sortir du nucléaire, were staged in five French towns to protest construction of EPR plants; Rennes, Lyon, Toulouse, Lille, and Strasbourg.

Following the 2011 Fukushima I nuclear accidents, around 1,000 people took part in a protest against nuclear power in Paris on March 20. Most of the protests, however, are focused on the closure of the Fessenheim Nuclear Power Plant, where some 3,800 French and Germans demonstrated on April 8 and April 25.

Thousands staged anti-nuclear protests around France, on the eve of the 25th anniversary of Chernobyl and after Japan's Fukushima nuclear disaster, demanding reactors be closed. Protesters' demands were focused on getting France to shut its oldest nuclear power station at Fessenheim, which lies in a densely populated part of France, less than two kilometres from Germany and around 40 kilometres (25 miles) from Switzerland.

Around 2,000 people also protested at the Cattenom nuclear plant, France's second most powerful, in the Mosel region to the northwest of Strasbourg. Protesters in southwestern France staged another demonstration in the form of a mass picnic in front of the Blayais nuclear reactor, also in memory of Chernobyl. In France's northwestern region of Brittany, around 800 people staged a good-humoured march in front of the Brennilis experimental heavy-water atomic plant that was built in the 1960s. It was taken offline in 1985 but its dismantling is still not completed after 25 years.

Three months after the Fukushima nuclear disaster, thousands of anti-nuclear campaigners protested in Paris.

On June 26, 2011, around 5,000 protesters gathered near Fessenheim nuclear power plant, demanding the plant be shut down immediately. Demonstrators from France and Germany came to Fessenheim and formed a human chain along the road. Protesters claim that the plant is vulnerable to flooding and earthquakes. Fessenheim has become a flashpoint in renewed debate over nuclear safety in France after the Fukushima accident. The plant is operated by French power group EDF.

In November 2011, thousands of anti-nuclear protesters delayed a train carrying radioactive waste from France to Germany. Many clashes and obstructions made the journey the slowest one since the annual shipments of radioactive waste began in 1995. The shipment, the first since Japan's Fukishima nuclear disaster, faced large protests in France where activists damaged the train tracks. Thousands of people in Germany also interrupted the train's journey, forcing it to proceed at a snail's pace, covering 1,200 kilometers (746 miles) in 109 hours. More than 200 people were reported injured in the protests and several arrests were made.

On December 5, 2011, nine Greenpeace activists cut through a fence at the Nogent Nuclear Power Plant. They scaled the roof of the domed reactor building and unfurled a "Safe Nuclear Doesn't Exist" banner before attracting the attention of security guards. Two activists remained at large for four hours. On the same day, two more campaigners breached the perimeter of the Cruas Nuclear Power Plant, escaping detection for more than 14 hours, while posting videos of their sit-in on the internet.

In Aquitaine, the local group TchernoBlaye continue to protest against the continued operation of the Blayais Nuclear Power Plant.

On the first anniversary of the Fukushima nuclear disaster, organisers of French anti-nuclear demonstrations claim 60,000 supporters formed a human chain 230 kilometres long, stretching from Lyon to Avignon.

In March 2014, police arrested 57 Greenpeace protesters who used a truck to break through security barriers and enter the Fessenheim nuclear power plant in eastern France. The activists hung antinuclear banners, but France's nuclear safety authority said that the plant's security had not been compromised. President Hollande has promised to close Fessenheim by 2016, but Greenpeace wants immediate closure.

== Germany ==
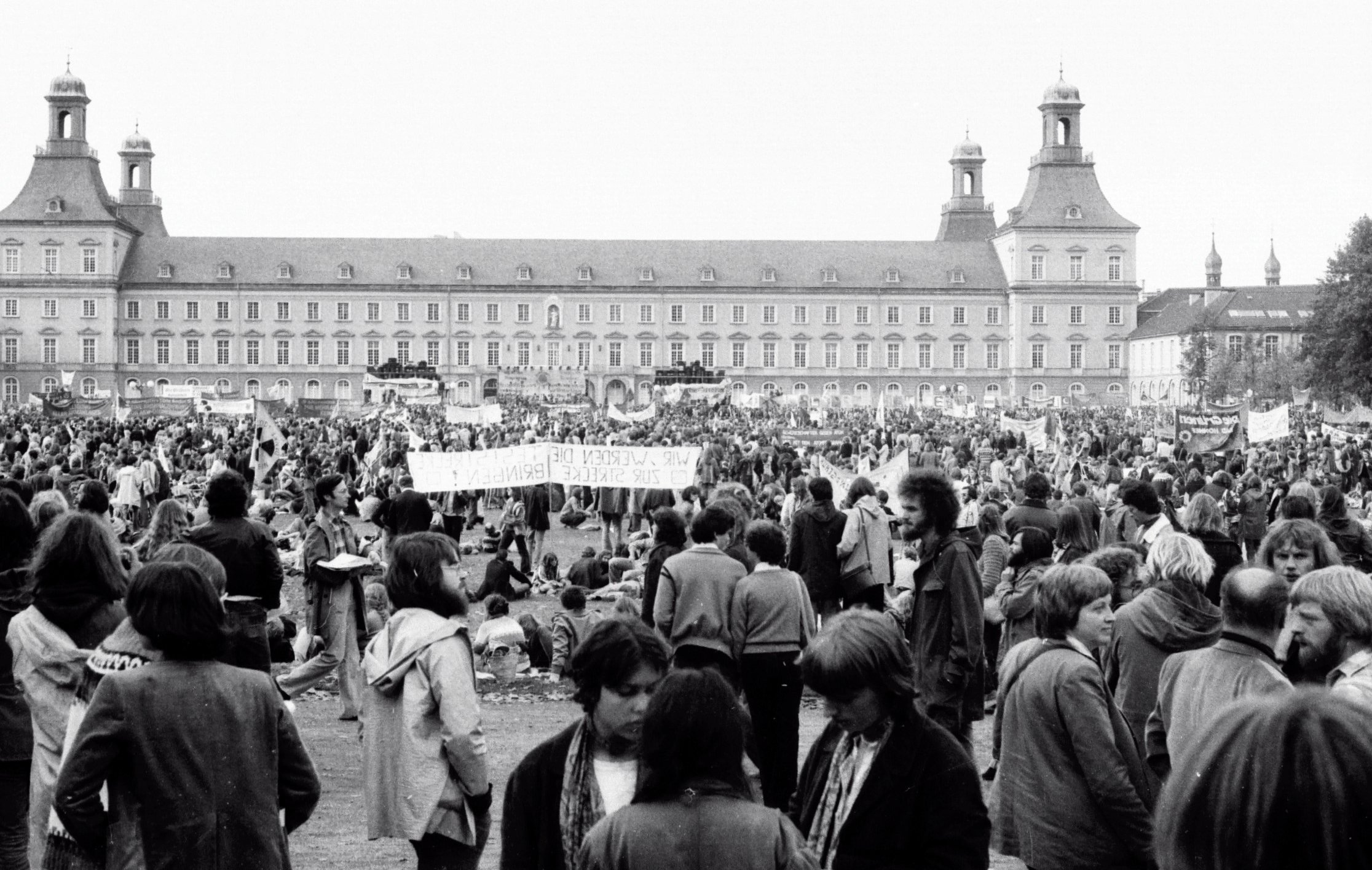
120,000 people attended an anti-nuclear protest in Bonn, Germany, on October 14, 1979, following the Three Mile Island accident.

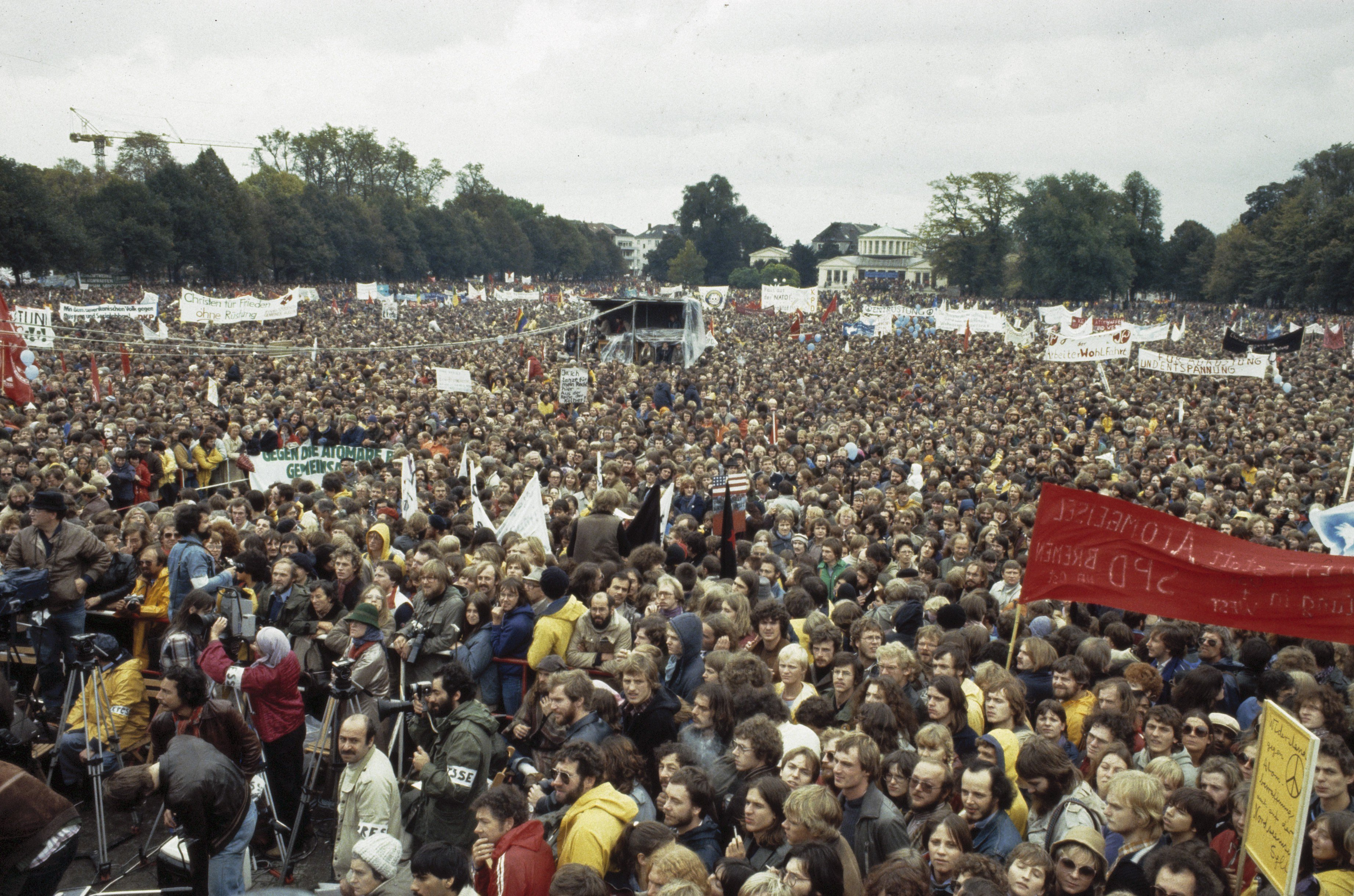
About 300,000 people protested in Bonn against the deployment of Pershing II missiles in Europe, 10 October 1981

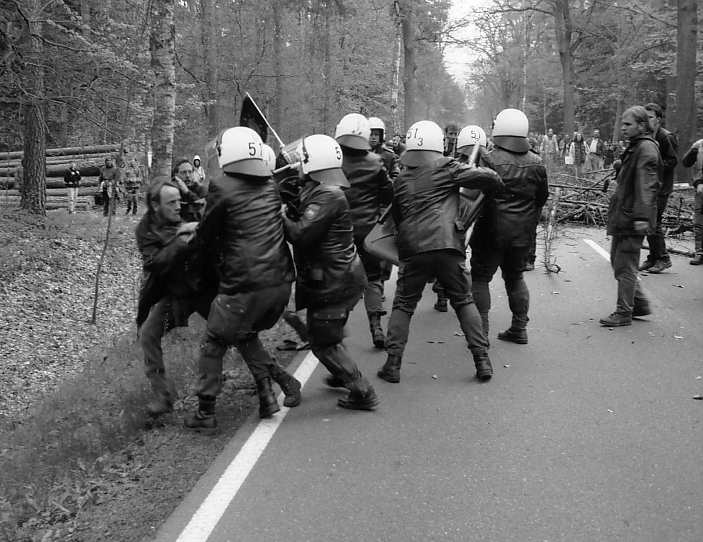
Anti-nuclear demonstrations near Gorleben, Lower Saxony, Germany, 8 May 1996.

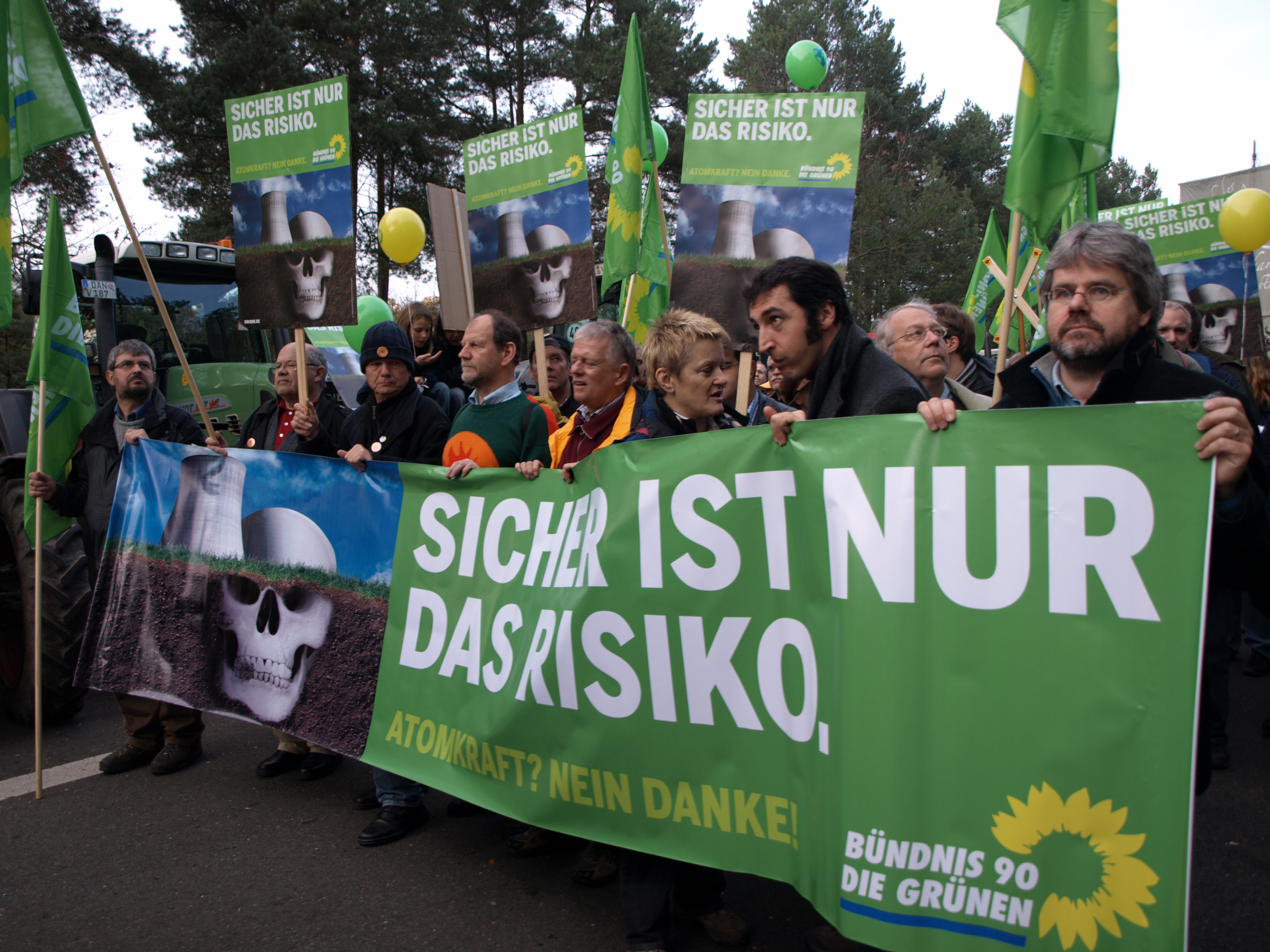
Anti-nuclear protest near nuclear waste disposal centre at Gorleben in Northern Germany, on 8 November 2008.

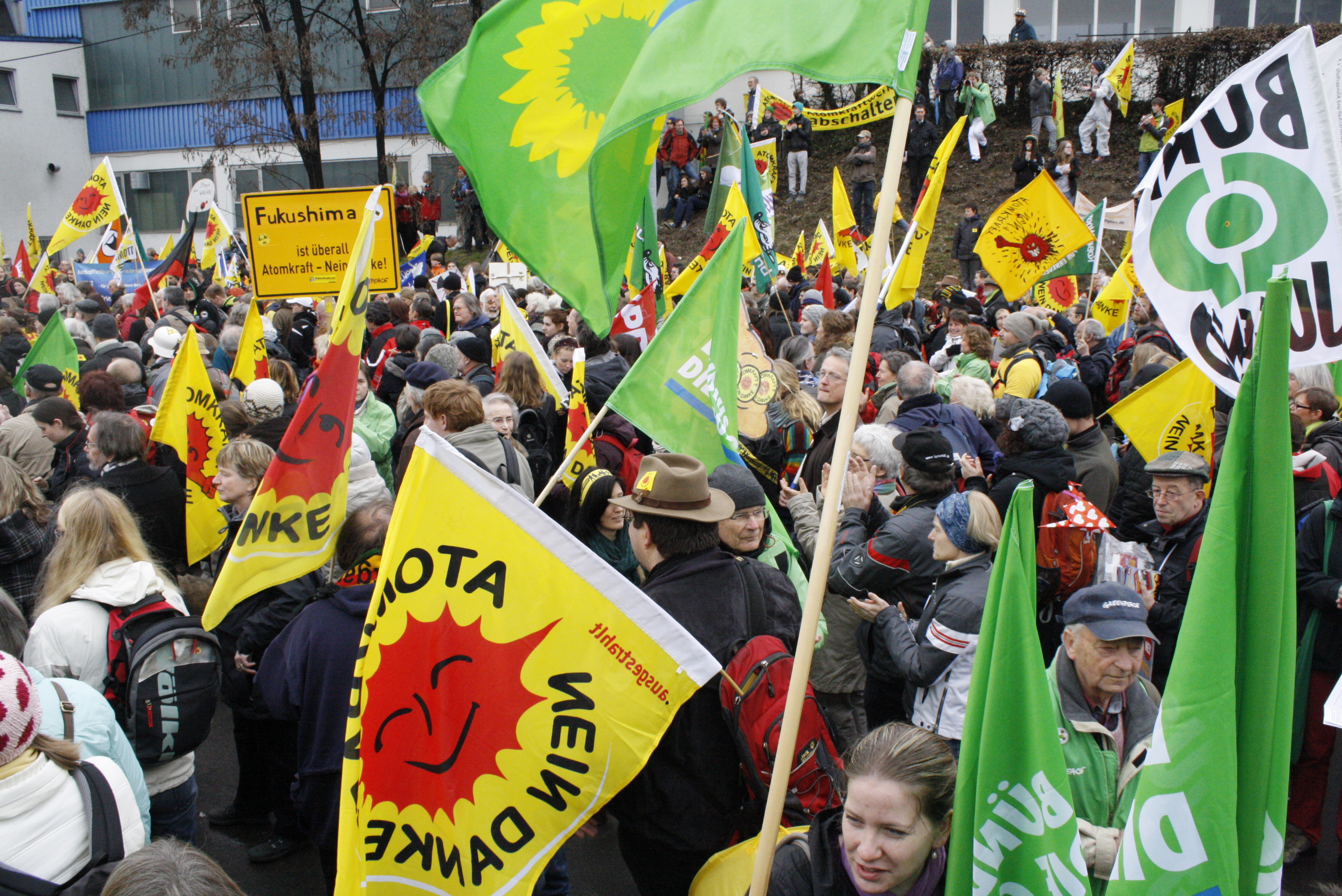
Protest at Neckarwestheim, Germany, 11 March 2012.

In 1971, the town of Wyhl, in Germany, was a proposed site for a nuclear power station. In the years that followed, public opposition steadily mounted, and there were large protests. Television coverage of police dragging away farmers and their wives helped to turn nuclear power into a major issue. In 1975, an administrative court withdrew the construction licence for the plant. The Wyhl experience encouraged the formation of citizen action groups near other planned nuclear sites. Many other anti-nuclear groups formed elsewhere, in support of these local struggles, and some existing citizen action groups widened their aims to include the nuclear issue.

In West Germany, between February 1975 and April 1979, some 280,000 people were involved in seven demonstrations at nuclear sites. Several site occupations were also attempted. In the aftermath of the Three Mile Island accident in 1979, some 200,000 people attended a demonstration against nuclear power in Hannover and Bonn.

In 1981, Germany's largest anti-nuclear power demonstration took place to protest against the construction of the Brokdorf Nuclear Power Plant on the North Sea coast west of Hamburg. Some 100,000 people came face to face with 10,000 police officers. Twenty-one policemen were injured by demonstrators armed with gasoline bombs, sticks, stones and high-powered slingshots.

The largest anti-nuclear protest was most likely a 1983 nuclear weapons protest in West Berlin which had about 600,000 participants.

In October 1983, nearly 3 million people across western Europe protested nuclear missile deployments and demanded an end to the nuclear arms race. The largest turnout of protesters occurred in West Germany when, on a single day, 400,000 people marched in Bonn, 400,000 in Hamburg, 250,000 in Stuttgart, and 100,000 in West Berlin.

In May 1986, following the Chernobyl disaster, clashes between anti-nuclear protesters and West German police became common. More than 400 people were injured in mid-May at the site of the Wackersdorf reprocessing plant (WAA) being built near Wackersdorf. Police "used water cannons and dropped tear-gas grenades from helicopters to subdue protesters armed with slingshots, crowbars and Molotov cocktails". The 5th Anti-WAAhnsinns Festival followed in July.

During a weekend in October 2008, some 15,000 people disrupted the transport of radioactive nuclear waste from France to a dump in Germany. This was one of the largest such protests in many years and, according to Der Spiegel, it signals a revival of the anti-nuclear movement in Germany. In 2009, the coalition of green parties in the European parliament, who are unanimous in their anti-nuclear position, increased their presence in the parliament from 5.5% to 7.1% (52 seats).

A convoy of 350 farm tractors and 50,000 protesters took part in an anti-nuclear rally in Berlin on September 5, 2009. The marchers demanded that Germany close all nuclear plants by 2020 and close the Gorleben radioactive dump. Gorleben is the focus of the anti-nuclear movement in Germany, which has tried to derail train transports of waste and to destroy or block the approach roads to the site. Two above-ground storage units house 3,500 containers of radioactive sludge and thousands of tonnes of spent fuel rods.

Following the Fukushima I nuclear accidents, anti-nuclear opposition intensified in Germany. On 12 March 2011, 60,000 Germans formed a 45-km human chain from Stuttgart to the Neckarwestheim power plant. On 14 March, 110,000 people protested in 450 other German towns, with opinion polls indicating 80% of Germans opposed the government's extension of nuclear power. On March 15, 2011, Angela Merkel said that seven nuclear power plants which went online before 1980 would be temporarily closed and the time would be used to study speedier renewable energy commercialization.

In March 2011, more than 200,000 people took part in anti-nuclear protests in four large German cities, on the eve of state elections. Organisers called it the biggest anti-nuclear demonstration the country has seen. Thousands of Germans demanding an end to the use of nuclear power took part in nationwide demonstrations on 2 April 2011. About 7,000 people took part in anti-nuclear protests in Bremen. About 3,000 people protested outside of RWE's headquarters in Essen.

Thousands of Germans demanding an end to the use of nuclear power took part in nationwide demonstrations on 2 April 2011. About 7,000 people took part in anti-nuclear protests in Bremen. About 3,000 people protested outside of RWE's headquarters in Essen. Other smaller rallies were held elsewhere.

Chancellor Angela Merkel's coalition announced on May 30, 2011, that Germany's 17 nuclear power stations will be shut down by 2022, in a policy reversal following Japan's Fukushima I nuclear accidents. Seven of the German power stations were closed temporarily in March, and they will remain off-line and be permanently decommissioned. An eighth was already off line, and will stay so.

In November 2011, thousands of anti-nuclear protesters delayed a train carrying radioactive waste from France to Germany. Many clashes and obstructions made the journey the slowest one since the annual shipments of radioactive waste began in 1995. The shipment, the first since Japan's Fukishima nuclear disaster, faced large protests in France where activists damaged the train tracks.

=== German Nuclear Power Plant Closures c. 2023 ===
In 2023, Germany closed all of its remaining Nuclear power plants. Environmentalists and commentators have criticized the closures for destabilizing the German power grid, and for forcing reliance on coal and other forms of carbon emitting fossil fuels to power the nation's towns and cities. Others have also pointed out the lack of domestic power production as a national security vulnerability, as most of the power that Germany imports comes from overseas, primarily from Russia.

== India ==
Following the March 2011 Fukushima disaster, many are questioning the mass roll-out of new plants in India, including the World Bank, the former Indian Environment Minister, Jairam Ramesh, and the former head of the country's nuclear regulatory body, A. Gopalakrishnan. The massive Jaitapur Nuclear Power Project is the focus of concern — "931 hectares of farmland will be needed to build the reactors, land that is now home to 10,000 people, their mango orchards, cashew trees and rice fields" — and it has attracted many protests. Fishermen in the region say their livelihoods will be wiped out.

Environmentalists, local farmers and fishermen have been protesting for months over the planned six-reactor nuclear power complex on the plains of Jaitapur, 420 km south of Mumbai. If built, it would be one of the world's largest nuclear power complexes. Protests have escalated in the wake of Japan's Fukushima I nuclear accidents. During two days of violent rallies in April 2011, a local man was killed and dozens were injured.

As of October 2011, thousands of protesters and villagers living around the Russian-built Koodankulam Nuclear Power Plant in the southern Tamil Nadu province, are blocking highways and staging hunger strikes, preventing further construction work, and demanding its closure as they fear of the disasters like the Environmental impact of nuclear power, Radioactive waste, nuclear accident similar to the releases of radioactivity in March at Japan's Fukushima nuclear disaster.

A Public Interest Litigation (PIL) has also been filed against the government's civil nuclear program at the apex Supreme Court. The PIL specifically asks for the "staying of all proposed nuclear power plants till satisfactory safety measures and cost-benefit analyses are completed by independent agencies".

The People's Movement Against Nuclear Energy is an anti-nuclear power group in Tamil Nadu, India. The aim of the group is to close the Kudankulam Nuclear Power Plant site and to preserve the largely untouched coastal landscape, as well as educate locals about nuclear power. In March 2012, police said they had arrested nearly 200 anti-nuclear activists who were protesting the restart of work at the long-stalled nuclear power plant. Engineers have resumed working on one of two 1,000-megawatt Koodankulam nuclear reactors a day after the local government gave the green light for the resumption of the Russia-backed project.

== Italy ==
In May 1986, an estimated 150,000 to 200,000 people marched in Rome to protest against the Italian nuclear program, and 50,000 marched in Milan.

== Japan ==
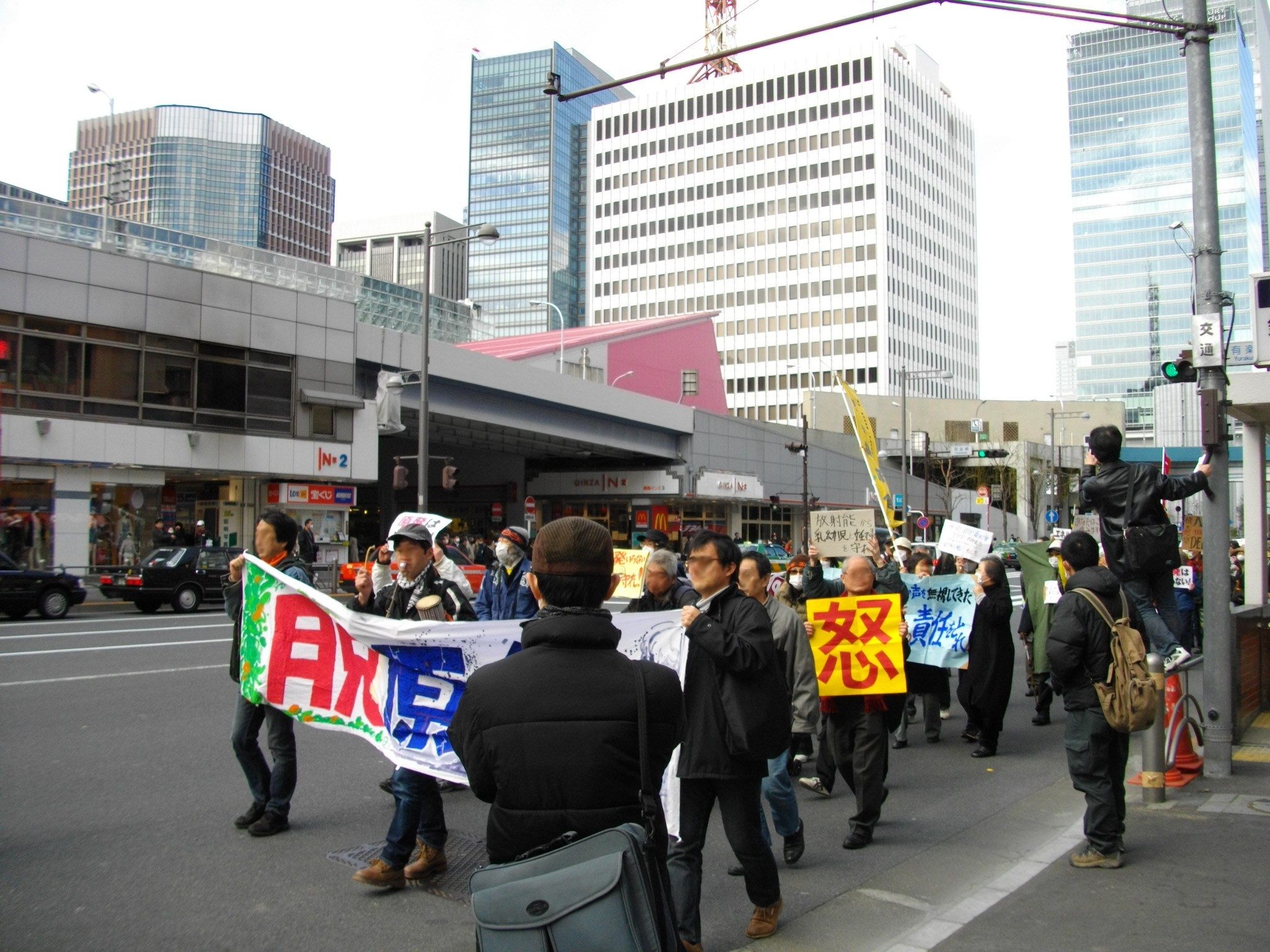
Anti nuclear rally in Tokyo on Sunday 27 March 2011.

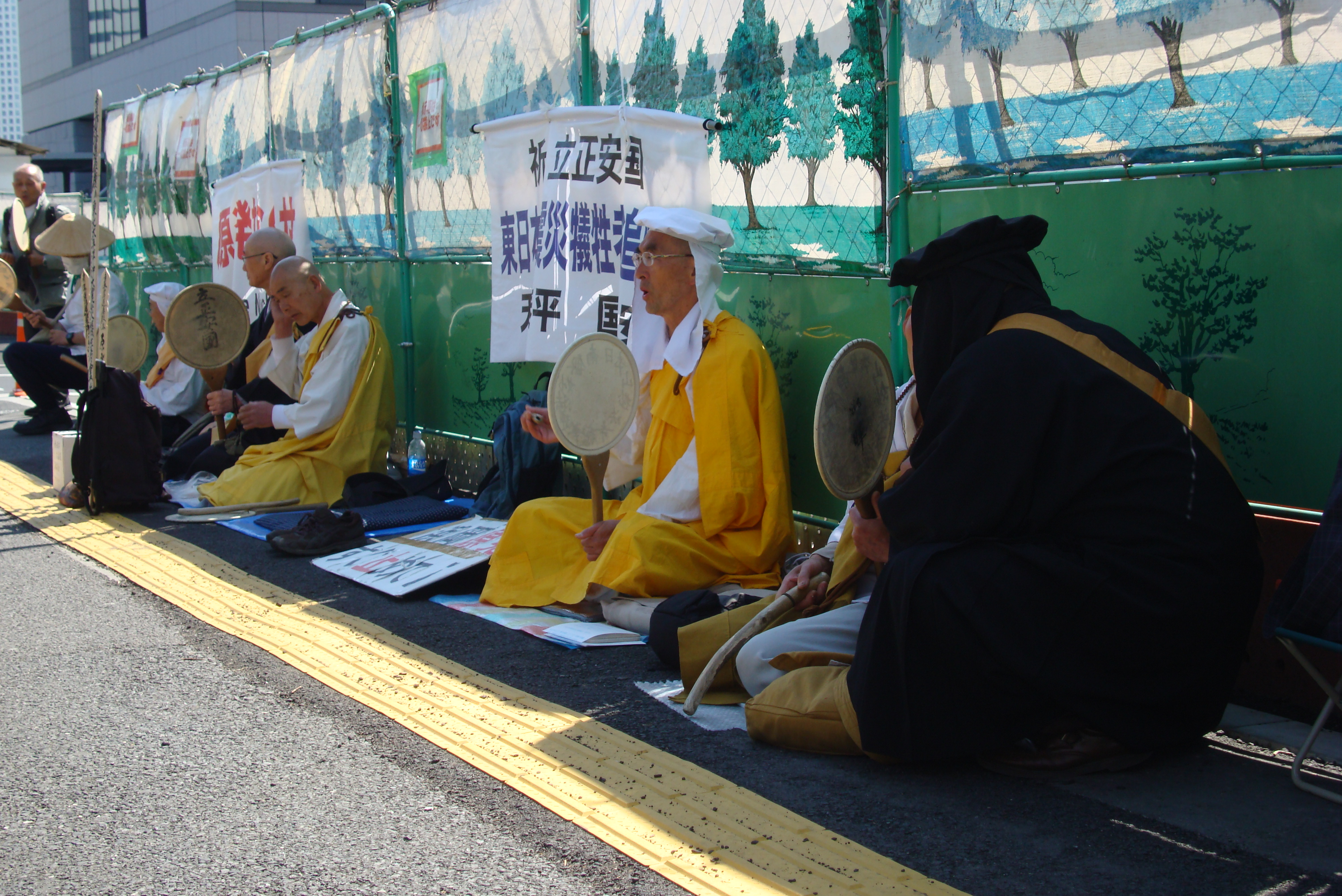
Buddhist monks of Nipponzan-Myōhōji protest against nuclear power near the Diet of Japan in Tokyo on April 5, 2011.

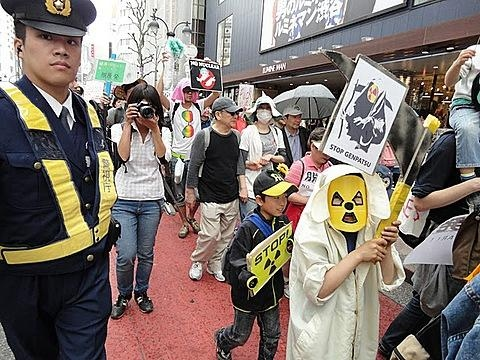
Peaceful anti-nuclear protest in Tokyo, Japan, escorted by policemen, 16 April 2011.

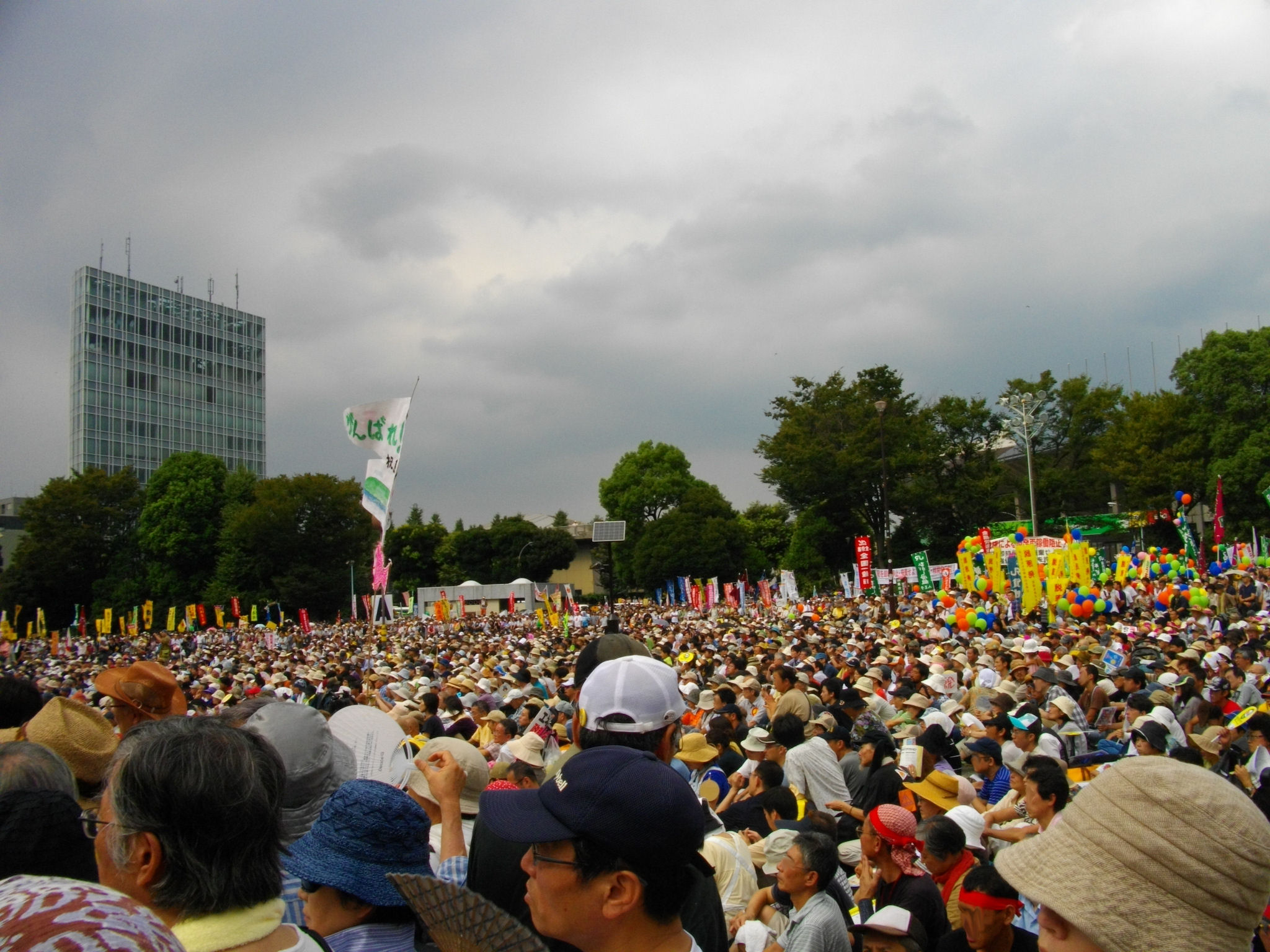
Anti-Nuclear Power Plant Rally on 19 September 2011 at Meiji Shrine complex in Tokyo.

In March 1982 some 200,000 people participated in a nuclear disarmament rally in Hiroshima. In May 1982, 400,000 people demonstrated in Tokyo. In mid-April, 17,000 people protested at two demonstrations in Tokyo against nuclear power.

In 1982, Chugoku Electric Power Company proposed building a nuclear power plant near Iwaishima, but many residents opposed the idea, and the island's fishing cooperative voted overwhelmingly against the plans. In January 1983, almost 400 islanders staged a protest march, which was the first of more than 1,000 protests the islanders carried out. Since the Fukushima nuclear disaster in March 2011 there has been wider opposition to construction plans for the plant.

Research results show that some 95 post-war attempts to site and build nuclear power plants resulted in only 54 completions. Many affected communities "fought back in highly publicized battles". Co-ordinated opposition groups, such as the Citizens' Nuclear Information Center and the anti-nuclear newspaper Hangenpatsu Shinbun have operated since the early 1980s. Cancelled plant orders included:

- The Maki NPP at Maki, Niigata (Kambara)—Canceled in 2003
- The Kushima NPP at Kushima, Miyazaki—1997
- The Ashihama NPP at Ashihama, Mie Prefecture—2000 (the first Project at the site in the 1970s where realized at Hamaoka as Unit 1&2)
- The Hōhoku NPP at Hōhoku, Yamaguchi—1994
- The Suzu NPP at Suzu, Ishikawa—2003

In May 2006, an international awareness campaign about the dangers of the Rokkasho Reprocessing Plant, Stop Rokkasho, was launched by musician Ryuichi Sakamoto. Greenpeace has opposed the Rokkasho Reprocessing Plant under a campaign called "Wings of Peace – No more Hiroshima Nagasaki", since 2002 and has launched a cyberaction to stop the project. Consumers Union of Japan together with 596 organisations and groups participated in a parade on 27 January 2008 in central Tokyo against the Rokkasho Reprocessing Plant. Over 810,000 signatures were collected and handed in to the government on 28 January 2008. Representatives of the protesters, which include fishery associations, consumer cooperatives and surfer groups, handed the petition to the Cabinet Office and the Ministry of Economy, Trade and Industry. Seven consumer organisations have joined in this effort: Consumers Union of Japan, Seikatsu Club Consumer's Co-operative Union, Daichi-o-Mamoru Kai, Green Consumer's Co-operative Union, Consumer's Co-operative Union "Kirari", Consumer's Co-operative Miyagi and Pal-system Co-operative Union. In June 2008, several scientists stated that the Rokkasho plant is sited directly above an active geological fault line that could produce a magnitude 8 earthquake. But Japan Nuclear Fuel Limited have stated that there was no reason to fear an earthquake of more than magnitude 6.5 at the site, and that the plant could withstand a 6.9 quake.

Three months after the Fukushima nuclear disaster, thousands of anti-nuclear protesters marched in Japan. Company workers, students, and parents with children rallied across Japan, "venting their anger at the government's handling of the crisis, carrying flags bearing the words 'No Nukes!' and 'No More Fukushima'." Problems in stabilizing the Fukushima I plant have hardened attitudes to nuclear power. As of June 2011, "more than 80 percent of Japanese now say they are anti-nuclear and distrust government information on radiation". The ongoing Fukushima crisis may spell the end of nuclear power in Japan, as "citizen opposition grows and local authorities refuse permission to restart reactors that have undergone safety checks". Local authorities are skeptical that sufficient safety measures have been taken and are reticent to give their permission – now required by law – to bring suspended nuclear reactors back online. More than 60,000 people in Japan marched in demonstrations in Tokyo, Osaka, Hiroshima and Fukushima on June 11, 2011.

In July 2011, Japanese mothers, many new to political activism, have started "taking to the streets to urge the government to protect their children from radiation leaking from the crippled Fukushima No. 1 nuclear plant". Using social networking media, such as Facebook and Twitter, they have "organized antinuclear energy rallies nationwide attended by thousands of protesters".

In September 2011, anti-nuclear protesters, marching to the beat of drums, "took to the streets of Tokyo and other cities to mark six months since the March earthquake and tsunami and vent their anger at the government's handling of the nuclear crisis set off by meltdowns at the Fukushima power plant". An estimated 2,500 people marched past TEPCO headquarters, and created a human chain around the building of the Trade Ministry that oversees the power industry. Protesters called for a complete shutdown of Japanese nuclear power plants and demanded a shift in government policy toward alternative sources of energy. Among the protestors were four young men who started a 10-day hunger strike to bring about change in Japan's nuclear policy.

Tens of thousands of people marched in central Tokyo in September 2011, chanting "Sayonara nuclear power" and waving banners, to call on Japan's government to abandon atomic energy in the wake of the Fukushima nuclear disaster. Author Kenzaburō Ōe, who won the Nobel Prize for literature in 1994, and has campaigned for pacifist and anti-nuclear causes addressed the crowd. Musician Ryuichi Sakamoto, who composed the score to the movie The Last Emperor was also among the event's supporters.

Thousands of demonstrators took to the streets of Yokohama on the weekend of January 14–15, 2012, to show their support for a nuclear power-free world. The demonstration showed that organized opposition to nuclear power has gained momentum in the wake of the Fukushima nuclear disaster. The most immediate demand was for the protection of rights for those affected by the Fukushima accident, including basic human rights such as health care, living standards and safety.

On the anniversary of the 11 March 2011 earthquake and tsunami all over Japan protesters called for the abolishment of nuclear power, and the scrapping of nuclear reactors.

- Tokyo:
  - a demonstration was held in the streets of Tokyo and the march ended in front of the headquarters of TEPCO
- Koriyama, Fukushima
  - 16,000 people were at a meeting, they walked through the city calling for the end of nuclear power.
- Shizuoka Prefecture
  - 1,100 people called for the scrapping of the Hamaoka reactors of Chubu Electric Power Co.
- Tsuruga, Fukui
  - 1,200 people marched in the streets of the city of Tsuruga, the home of the Monju fast-breeder reactor prototype and the nuclear reactors of Kansai Electric Power Co.
  - The crowd objected the restart of the reactors of the Oi-nuclear power plant. Of which NISA did approve the so-called stress-tests, after the reactors were taken out of service for a regular check-up.
- Saga city, Aomori city
  - Likewise protests were held in the cities of Saga and Aomori and at various other places hosting nuclear facilities.
- Nagasaki and Hiroshima
  - Anti-nuclear protesters and atomic-bomb survivors marched together and demanded that Japan should end its dependency on nuclear power.

In June 2012, tens of thousands of protesters participated in anti-nuclear power rallies in Tokyo and Osaka, over the government's decision to restart the first idled reactors since the Fukushima disaster, at Oi Nuclear Power Plant in Fukui Prefecture.

== Netherlands ==
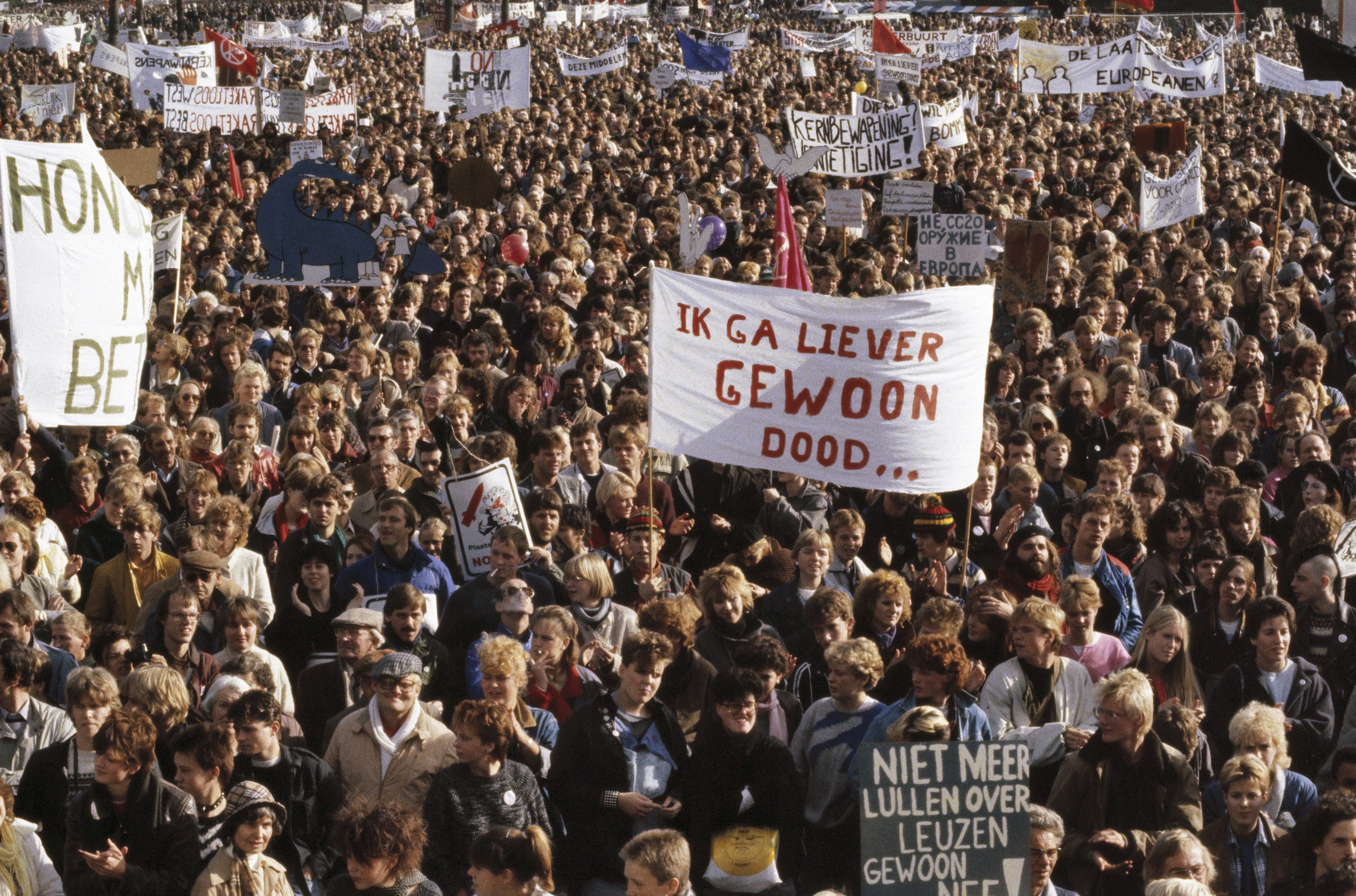
Protest in The Hague against the nuclear arms race between the U.S./NATO and the Warsaw Pact, 1983

On 21 November 1981, a large demonstration against nuclear weapons was organised in Amsterdam. The demonstration was attended by 400,000 to 450,000 people, and was organised by the Interkerkelijk Vredesberaad (Interdenominational Peace Council) in collaboration with political parties, unions, and peace groups. On 29 October 1983, the Committee Cruise Missiles No organised a demonstration in The Hague, Netherlands which was attended by 550,000 people, and was the largest demonstration in the history of the Netherlands.

== New Zealand ==
From the early 1960s New Zealand peace groups CND and the Peace Media organised nationwide anti-nuclear campaigns in protest of atmospheric testing in French Polynesia. These included two large national petitions presented to the New Zealand government which led to a joint New Zealand and Australian Government action to take France to the International Court of Justice (1972). In 1972, Greenpeace and an amalgam of New Zealand peace groups managed to delay nuclear tests by several weeks by trespassing with a ship in the testing zone. During the time, the skipper, David McTaggart, was beaten and severely injured by members of the French military.

On 1 July 1972, the Canadian ketch Vega, flying the Greenpeace III banner, collided with the French naval minesweeper La Paimpolaise while in international waters to protest French nuclear weapon tests in the South Pacific.

In 1973 the New Zealand Peace Media organised an international flotilla of protest yachts including the Fri, Spirit of Peace, Boy Roel, Magic Island and the Tanmure to sail into the test exclusion zone. Also in 1973, New Zealand Prime Minister Norman Kirk as a symbolic act of protest sent two navy frigates, HMNZS Canterbury and HMNZS Otago, to Mururoa. They were accompanied by HMAS Supply, a fleet oiler of the Royal Australian Navy.

Following decades of protest, including the disruption of warship visits, the New Zealand government placed a ban on nuclear-powered and armed vessels entering its waters in 1984. This was subsequently expanded to include weapons on land and in its airspace.

In 1985 the Greenpeace ship Rainbow Warrior was bombed and sunk by the French DGSE in Auckland, New Zealand, as it prepared for another protest of nuclear testing in the French military zone at Mururoa Atoll. One crew member, Fernando Pereira of Portugal, photographer, drowned on the sinking ship while attempting to recover his photographic equipment. Two members of DGSE were captured and sentenced, but eventually repatriated to France in a controversial affair.

== Philippines ==
In the Philippines, a focal point for protests in the late 1970s and 1980s was the proposed Bataan Nuclear Power Plant, which was built but never operated. The project was criticised for being a potential threat to public health, especially since the plant was located in an earthquake zone.

== South Korea ==
In March 2012, environmental conservation groups staged a rally in central Seoul to voice opposition to nuclear power on the first anniversary of the Fukushima nuclear disaster. According to organizers, over 5,000 people attended, and the turnout was one of the biggest in recent memory for an antinuclear demonstration. The rally adopted a declaration demanding that President Lee Myung Bak abandon his policy to promote nuclear power.

== Spain ==
In Spain, in response to a surge in nuclear power plant proposals in the 1960s, a strong anti-nuclear movement emerged in 1973, which ultimately impeded the realisation of most of the projects. On July 14, 1977, in Bilbao, Spain, between 150,000 and 200,000 people protested against the Lemoniz Nuclear Power Plant. This has been called the "biggest ever anti-nuclear demonstration".

== Sweden ==
In June 2010, Greenpeace anti-nuclear activists invaded Forsmark nuclear power plant to protest the then-plan to remove the government prohibition on building new nuclear power plants. In October 2012, 20 Greenpeace activists scaled the outer perimeter fence of the Ringhals nuclear plant, and there was also an incursion of 50 activists at the Forsmark plant. Greenpeace said that its non-violent actions were protests against the continuing operation of these reactors, which it says are unsafe in European stress tests, and to emphasise that stress tests did nothing to prepare against threats from outside the plant. A report by the Swedish nuclear regulator said that "the current overall level of protection against sabotage is insufficient". Although Swedish nuclear power plants have security guards, the police are responsible for emergency response. The report criticised the level of cooperation between nuclear site staff and police in the case of sabotage or attack.

== Switzerland ==
In May 2011, some 20,000 people turned out for Switzerland's largest anti-nuclear power demonstration in 25 years. Demonstrators marched peacefully near the Beznau Nuclear Power Plant, the oldest in Switzerland, which started operating 40 years ago. Days after the anti-nuclear rally, Cabinet decided to ban the building of new nuclear power reactors. The country's five existing reactors would be allowed to continue operating, but "would not be replaced at the end of their life span".

== Taiwan ==
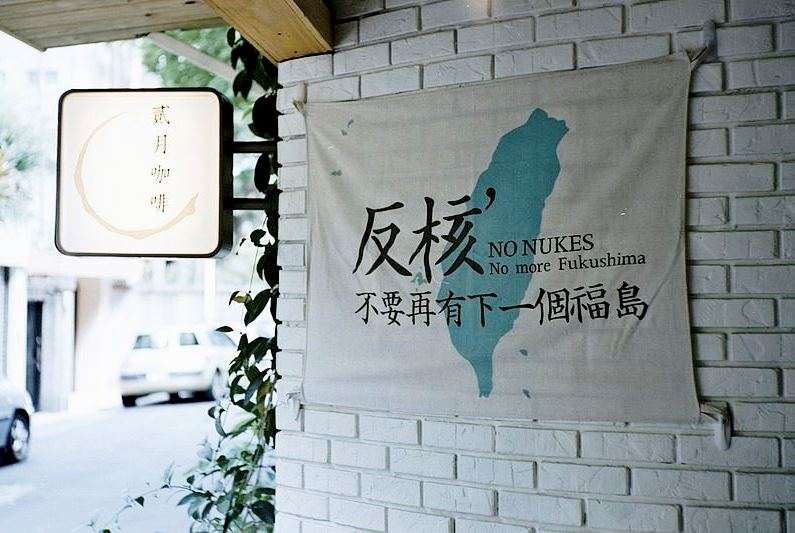
Anti Taiwan's 4th nuclear power plant banner.

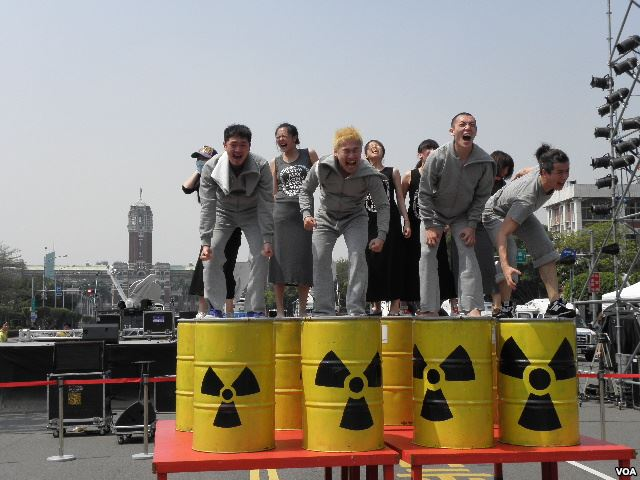
Anti-nuclear movements in Taipei

In March 2011, around 2,000 anti-nuclear protesters demonstrated in Taiwan for an immediate end to the construction of the island's fourth nuclear power plant. The protesters were also opposed to lifespan extensions for three existing nuclear plants.

In May 2011, 5,000 people joined an anti-nuclear protest in Taipei City, which had a carnival-like atmosphere, with protesters holding yellow banners and waving sunflowers. This was part of a nationwide "No Nuke Action" protest, against construction of the fourth nuclear plant and in favor of a more renewable energy policy.

On World Environment Day in June 2011, environmental groups demonstrated against Taiwan's nuclear power policy. The Taiwan Environmental Protection Union, together with 13 environmental groups and legislators, gathered in Taipei and protested against the nation's three operating nuclear power plants and the construction of the fourth plant.

In March 2012, about 2,000 people staged an anti-nuclear protest in Taiwan's capital following the massive earthquake and tsunami that hit Japan one year ago. The protesters rallied in Taipei to renew calls for a nuclear-free island by taking lessons from Japan's disaster on March 11, 2011. They "want the government to scrap a plan to operate a newly constructed nuclear power plant – the fourth in densely populated Taiwan". Scores of aboriginal protesters "demanded the removal of 100,000 barrels of nuclear waste stored on their Orchid Island, off south-eastern Taiwan. Authorities have failed to find a substitute storage site amid increased awareness of nuclear danger over the past decade".

In March 2013, 68,000 Taiwanese protested across major cities against the island's fourth nuclear power plant, which is under construction. Taiwan's three existing nuclear plants are near the ocean, and prone to geological fractures, under the island.

Active seismic faults run across the island, and some environmentalists argue Taiwan is unsuited for nuclear plants. Construction of the Lungmen Nuclear Power Plant using the ABWR design has encountered public opposition and a host of delays, and in April 2014 the government decided to halt construction.

== United Kingdom ==
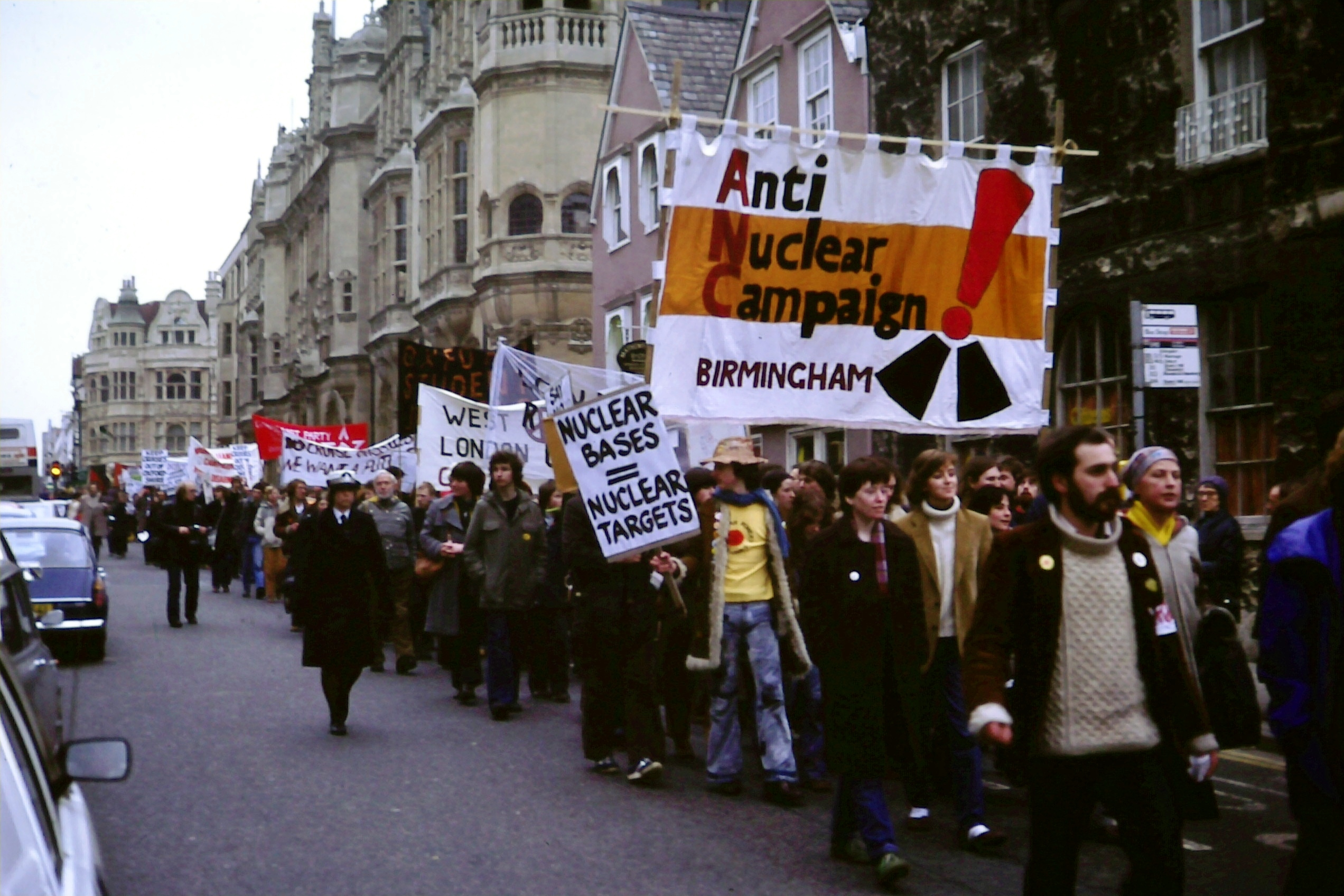
Anti-nuclear weapons protest march in Oxford, 1980

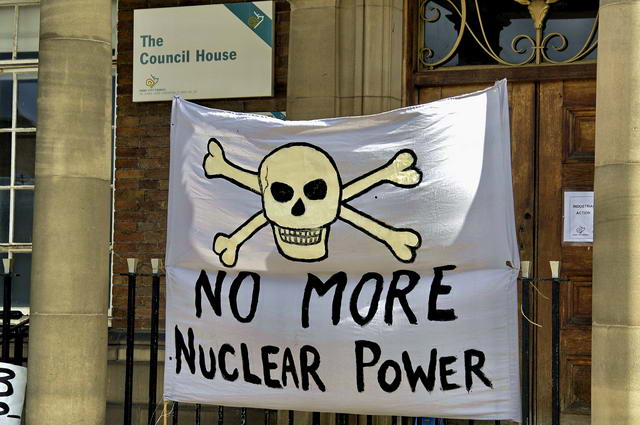
In March 2006, a protest took place in Derby where campaigners handed a letter to Margaret Beckett, head of DEFRA, outside Derby City Council about the dangers of nuclear power stations.

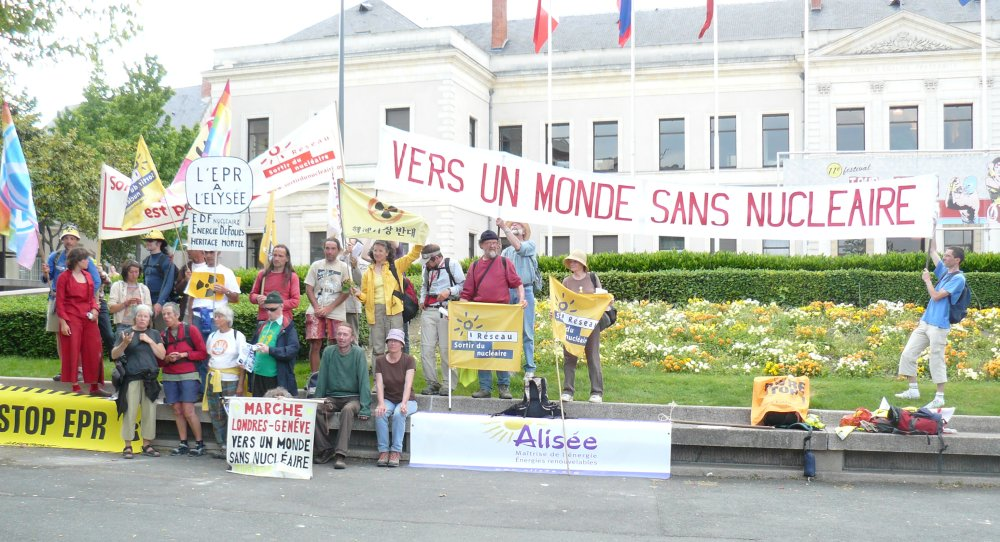
Anti-nuclear march from London to Geneva, 2008

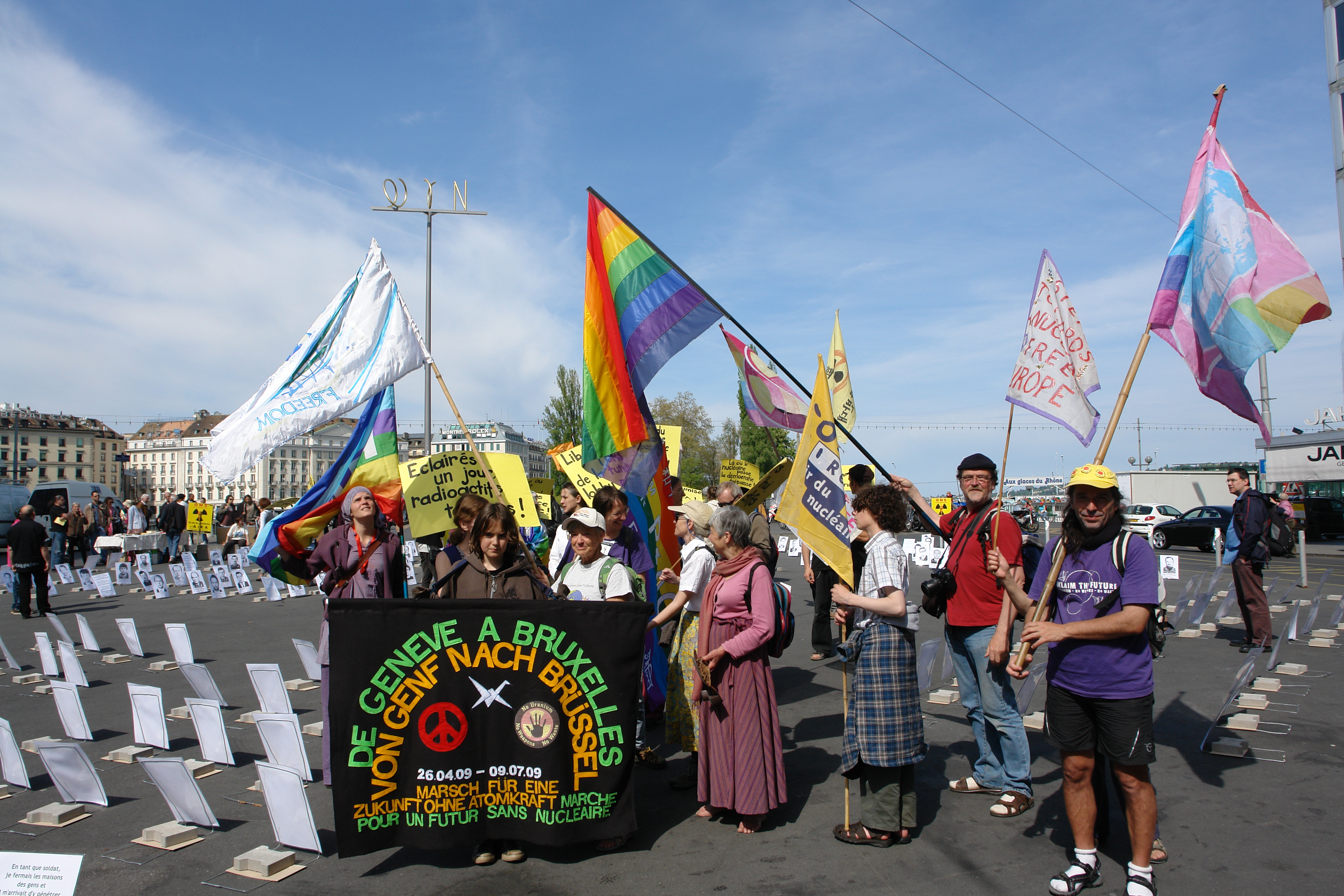
Start of anti-nuclear march from Geneva to Brussels, 2009

The first Aldermaston March organised by the Campaign for Nuclear Disarmament took place at Easter 1958, when several thousand people marched for four days from Trafalgar Square, London, to the Atomic Weapons Research Establishment close to Aldermaston in Berkshire, England, to demonstrate their opposition to nuclear weapons. The Aldermaston marches continued into the late 1960s when tens of thousands of people took part in the four-day marches.

Many significant anti-nuclear mobilizations in the 1980s occurred at the Greenham Common Women's Peace Camp. It began in September 1981 after a Welsh group called "Women for Life on Earth" arrived at Greenham to protest against the decision of the Government to allow cruise missiles to be based there. The women's peace camp attracted significant media attention and "prompted the creation of other peace camps at more than a dozen sites in Britain and elsewhere in Europe". In December 1982 some 30,000 women from various peace camps and other peace organisations held a major protest against nuclear weapons on Greenham Common.

On 1 April 1983, about 70,000 people linked arms to form a human chain between three nuclear weapons centres in Berkshire. The anti-nuclear demonstration stretched for 14 miles along the Kennet Valley.

In London, in October 1983, more than 300,000 people assembled in Hyde Park. This was "the largest protest against nuclear weapons in British history", according to The New York Times.

In 2005 in Britain, there were many protests about the government's proposal to replace the aging Trident weapons system with a newer model. The largest protest had 100,000 participants and, according to polls, 59 percent of the public opposed the move.

In October 2008 in the United Kingdom, more than 30 people were arrested during one of the largest anti-nuclear protests at the Atomic Weapons Establishment at Aldermaston for 10 years. The demonstration marked the start of the UN World Disarmament Week and involved about 400 people.

In October 2011, more than 200 protesters blockaded the Hinkley Point C nuclear power station site. Members of several anti-nuclear groups that are part of the Stop New Nuclear alliance barred access to the site in protest at EDF Energy's plans to renew the site with two new reactors.

In January 2012, three hundred anti-nuclear protestors took to the streets of Llangefnia, against plans to build a new nuclear power station at Wylfa. The march was organised by a number of organisations, including Pobl Atal Wylfa B, Greenpeace and Cymdeithas yr Iaith, which are supporting farmer Richard Jones who is in dispute with Horizon.

On March 10, 2012, the first anniversary of the Fukushima nuclear disaster, hundreds of anti-nuclear campaigners formed a symbolic chain around Hinkley Point to express their determined opposition to new nuclear power plants, and to call on the coalition government to abandon its plan for seven other new nuclear plants across the UK.

In April 2013, thousands of Scottish campaigners, MSPs, and union leaders, rallied against nuclear weapons. The Scrap Trident Coalition wants to see an end to nuclear weapons, and says saved monies should be used for health, education and welfare initiatives. There was also a blockade of the Faslane Naval Base, where Trident missiles are stored.

== United States ==
Map of major U.S. nuclear weapons infrastructure sites during the Cold War and into the present. Places with grayed-out names are no longer functioning and are in various stages of environmental remediation.

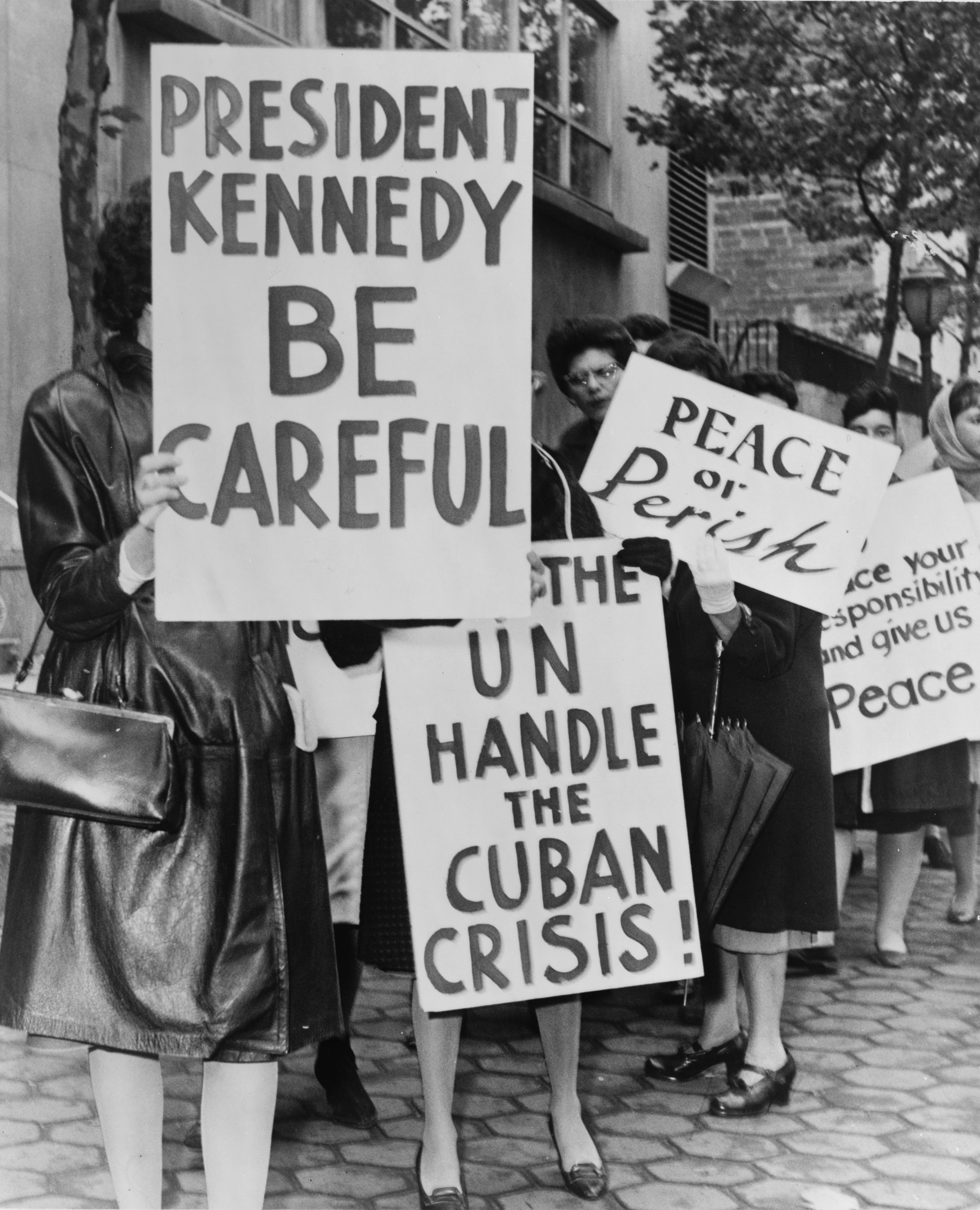
Women Strike for Peace during the Cuban Missile Crisis in 1962.

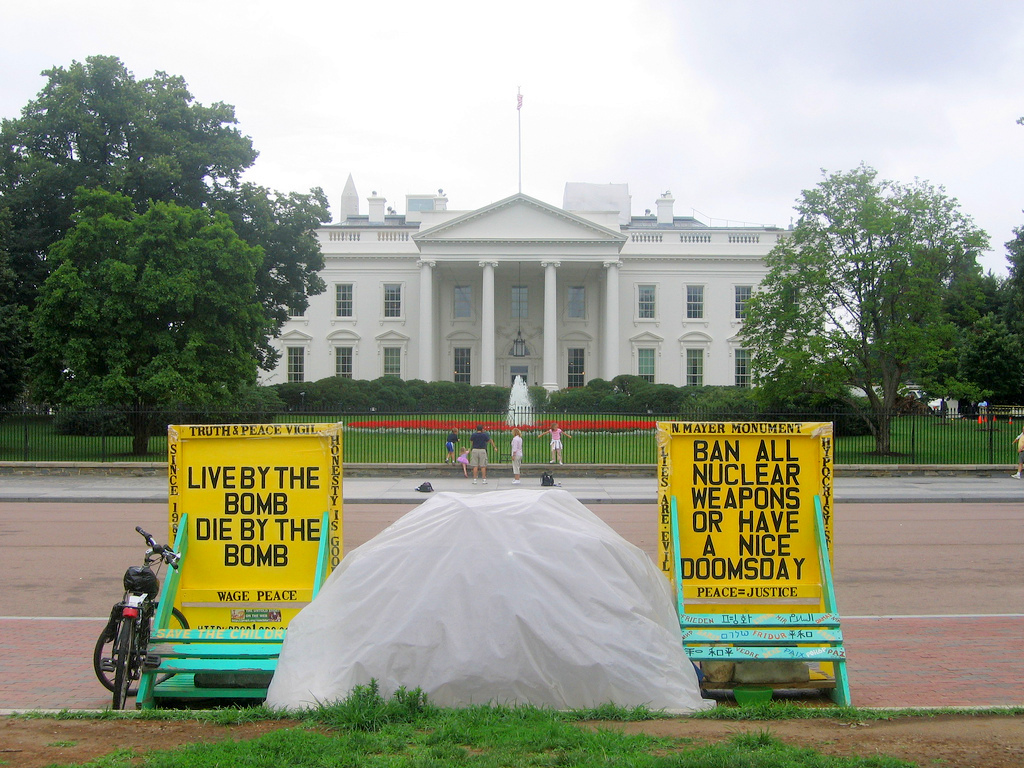
The White House Peace Vigil, June 2006

On November 1, 1961, at the height of the Cold War, about 50,000 women brought together by Women Strike for Peace marched in 60 cities in the United States to demonstrate against nuclear weapons. It was the largest national women's peace protest of the 20th century.

On May 2, 1977, 1,414 Clamshell Alliance protesters were arrested at Seabrook Station Nuclear Power Plant. The protesters who were arrested were charged with criminal trespass and asked to post bail ranging from $100 to $500. They refused and were then held in five national guard armories for 12 days. The Seabrook conflict, and role of New Hampshire governor Meldrim Thomson, received much national media coverage.

The American public were concerned about the release of radioactive gas from the Three Mile Island accident in 1979 and many mass demonstrations took place across the country in the following months. The largest one was held in New York City in September 1979 and involved two hundred thousand people; speeches were given by Jane Fonda and Ralph Nader.

On June 3, 1981, Thomas launched the longest running peace vigil in US history at Lafayette Square in Washington, D.C. He was later joined on the White House Peace Vigil by anti-nuclear activists Concepcion Picciotto and Ellen Benjamin.

On June 12, 1982, one million people demonstrated in New York City's Central Park against nuclear weapons and for an end to the Cold War arms race. It was the largest anti-nuclear protest and the largest political demonstration in American history.

Beginning in 1982, an annual series of Christian peace vigils called the "Lenten Desert Experience" were held over a period of several weeks at a time, at the entrance to the Nevada Test Site in the USA. This led to a faith-based aspect of the nuclear disarmament movement and the formation of the anti-nuclear Nevada Desert Experience group.

The Seneca Women's Encampment for a Future of Peace and Justice was located in Seneca County, New York, adjacent to the Seneca Army Depot. It took place mainly during the summer of 1983. Thousands of women came to participate and rally against nuclear weapons and the "patriarchal society" that created and used those weapons. The purpose of the Encampment was to stop the scheduled deployment of Cruise and Pershing II missiles before their suspected shipment from the Seneca Army Depot to Europe that fall. The Encampment continued as an active political presence in the Finger Lakes area for at least 5 more years.

Hundreds of people walked from Los Angeles to Washington, D.C., in 1986 in what is referred to as the Great Peace March for Global Nuclear Disarmament. The march took nine months to traverse 3,700 miles (6,000 km), advancing approximately fifteen miles per day.

Other notable anti-nuclear protests in the United States have included:

- May 2, 1977: 1,414 protesters were arrested at Seabrook, an event which received much media coverage.
- June 1978: some 12,000 people attended a protest at Seabrook.
- August 1978: almost 500 Abalone Alliance protesters were arrested at Diablo Canyon Nuclear Power Plant.
- April 8, 1979: 30,000 people marched in San Francisco to support shutting down the Diablo Canyon nuclear power plant.
- April 28, 1979: 15,000 people demonstrated against the Rocky Flats Nuclear Processing Plant in Colorado, making the link between nuclear power and nuclear weaponry.
- May 1979: An estimated 65,000 people, including the governor of California, attended a march and rally against nuclear power in Washington, D.C.
- June 2, 1979: about 500 people were arrested for protesting about construction of the Black Fox Nuclear Power Plant in Oklahoma.
- June 3, 1979: following the Three Mile Island accident, some 15,000 people attended a rally organized by the Shad Alliance and about 600 were arrested at Shoreham Nuclear Power Plant in New York.
- June 30, 1979: about 40,000 people attended a protest rally at Diablo Canyon.
- June 22, 1980: about 15,000 people attended a protest near San Onofre Nuclear Generating Station in California.
- September, 1981: close to 2,000 arrests were made during an attempted occupation at Diablo Canyon Nuclear Power Plant.
- June 5, 1989: Police arrested 627 people protesting at Seabrook Nuclear Power Station.
- 1997: Over 2,000 people turned out for a demonstration at the Nevada Test Site and 700 were arrested.

Anti-nuclear protests preceded the shutdown of the Shoreham, Yankee Rowe, Millstone I, Rancho Seco, Maine Yankee, and about a dozen other nuclear power plants.

On May 1, 2005, 40,000 anti-nuclear/anti-war protesters marched past the United Nations in New York, 60 years after the atomic bombings of Hiroshima and Nagasaki. This was the largest anti-nuclear rally in the U.S. for several decades.

In 2008 and 2009, there have been protests about, and criticism of, several new nuclear reactor proposals in the United States. There have also been some objections to license renewals for existing nuclear plants.

In May 2010, some 25,000 people, including members of peace organizations and 1945 atomic bomb survivors, marched for about two kilometers from downtown New York to a square in front of United Nations headquarters, calling for the elimination of nuclear weapons. The march occurred ahead of the opening of the review conference on the Non-Proliferation of Nuclear Weapons Treaty (NPT).

== USSR ==
The anti-nuclear organisation "Nevada Semipalatinsk" was formed in 1989 and was one of the first major anti-nuclear groups in the former Soviet Union. It attracted thousands of people to its protests and campaigns which eventually led to the closure of the nuclear test site at Semipalatinsk, in north-east Kazakhstan, in 1991. The Soviet Union conducted over 400 nuclear weapons tests at the Semipalatinsk Test Site between 1949 and 1989. The United Nations believes that one million people were exposed to radiation.

== See also ==
- List of peace activists
