= United States beef imports in Taiwan =

The status of United States beef imports has been an issue in Taiwan–United States relations. Controversy has centered on cases of bovine spongiform encephalopathy (BSE; commonly known as mad cow disease), and the use of ractopamine as an additive in feeds.

The conflict has sometimes been called the "beef war" in the media, similar to the UK–EU Beef war over BSE.

== Bans due to BSE ==
The discovery of a case of BSE in the United States in December 2003 caused the Council of Agriculture in Taiwan to ban the import of beef and lamb products from the United States. The ban was lifted in April 2005, and reapplied to beef in June 2005 when a second case of BSE was discovered. This ban was conditionally lifted in January 2006, with imports limited to deboned beef from cattle under 30 months old.

== Controversy over ractopamine ==
In October 2006, ractopamine was banned in Taiwan along with other beta-adrenergic agonists. In August 2007, the Department of Health announced that it was setting a limit on the level of residual ractopamine in meat products, effectively replacing the ban. This proved controversial, spurring protests from pig farmers in Taiwan, and the ban was retained.

In February 2012, the Central News Agency reported that large quantities of beef imported from the US were being rejected every month due to residual ractopamine having been detected during inspection.

== Developments ==
In November 2009, limitations were relaxed to allow beef with bones still attached to be imported. The new rules also permitted the import of ground beef and internal organs, but it was intentionally made difficult or impossible through technical regulations. The change sparked a backlash in public opinion, and a bill was passed in the Legislative Yuan in January 2010 reinstating the ban on ground beef and internal organs.

In March 2012, the Taiwanese government announced that it was moving toward conditionally unbanning ractopamine. While the drug would be granted a maximum residual level for beef, it would remain banned for pork, and the ban on the import of internal organs of cattle would remain in place.

On 24 April 2012, United States authorities reported that a dairy cow in California was found to be suffering from BSE, the first known case in the country in 6 years. Three days later, on 27 April, legislators belonging to the opposition DPP, PFP and TSU in Taiwan's Legislative Yuan raised a motion to vote on a proposal to temporarily ban the import of all beef from the United States, to remove US beef from store shelves, and to seal cases awaiting inspection at customs. The motion was narrowly defeated 44–45 when Legislative Yuan President Wang Jin-Pyng voted in opposition.

On 25 July 2012, the Legislative Yuan passed amendments to the Act Governing Food Sanitation, authorising government agencies to set safety standards for ractopamine. Following this development, food safety and nutrition exports from the Department of Health agreed on a maximum residual level of 10 ppb for ractopamine in beef on 31 July.

== Relevance to Taiwan–US relations ==
The United States government has made beef exports a key issue in bilateral trade with Taiwan. When the Taiwanese Legislative Yuan reinstated the ban on imports of ground beef and internal organs of cattle in January 2010, the American Institute in Taiwan (AIT) issued a statement saying that the action undermined Taiwan's credibility as a trading partner, and made future agreements on bilateral trade more difficult. On 27 June 2012, William Stanton, director of the Taipei office of the AIT, said that the issue had become "the symbolic embodiment of Taiwan's protected markets", noting on the same occasion that "Taiwan must undertake very serious reform efforts" if it wanted to sign a free trade agreement with the United States or become a member of the Trans-Pacific Partnership.

== See also ==
- US beef imports in Japan
- US beef imports in South Korea
- Taiwan–United States relations
