= Spottoon =

Webtoon publishing company

- Website type: Webtoon platform
- Available in: English
- Owner: Rolling Story Inc.
- Website: spottoon.com
- Commercial: Yes
- Registration: Optional
- Launched: September 2015
- Current status: Active

Spottoon is a webtoon portal for English translated webtoons. It is a business run by RollingStory Inc. It is one of only two webtoon portals that offers licensed titles in English alongside Tappytoon.

== History ==
Spottoon was created by RollingStory, a global creative content servicing company based in Seoul, South Korea. The company was founded in December 2014, by the Hankyoreh Media Group and Toonion, a comic book artists union, with the initial mission to create a webtoon servicing platform for an English-language audience. With an established library containing titles such as Moss by acclaimed webtoon artist Yoon Tae-ho and Amanza Drama by Bo-Tong Kim, RollingStory adopted an overlaying mission to "move people with great stories" through its service.

In September 2015, RollingStory launched its main sharing platform, Spottoon. Twenty webtoon series were carefully chosen to be a part of the first wave of English translated releases. New episodes for each series are released every week and new series are being added on a continuous basis.

Upon its creation and prior to the release of Spottoon, RollingStory announced a partnership with the Huffington Post that would allow for the publication of several titles on the company's online news site.

RollingStory and Spottoon also entered a representation deal with Batman producer Michael Uslan and his son David Uslan for the potential live-action adaptations of several webtoons in the Spottoon library. It was announced that Peak, a webtoon about a group of young men completing their military service, would be the first to go into development. Two other webtoons, Tribe X and The Clockworkers, were also a part of the deal.

In September 2015, RollingStory and Spottoon took part in the first exhibition devoted to webtoons in the United States. Titled "WEBTOON", the exhibition was organized by the Korean Cultural Service of New York and chronicled the history of webtoon culture. Titles from the Spottoon collection were featured throughout the exhibition and films that were adapted from webtoons, such as Moss and Secretly, Greatly were screened as a part of the event.

Spottoon can be accessed through its main website and through its android and iOS apps.

Access to their comics requires an account after the first three preview chapters, and the most recent chapters are pay to view.
