= United States beef imports in Japan =

United States beef imports in Japan were a contentious issue in Japan–United States relations after BSE (mad cow disease) was detected in a steer in Washington. After multiple beef import restrictions in Japan, the United States and Japan struck a trade deal to lift the beef import ban in May 2019. Exports of U.S. beef to Japan totaled almost $2.4 billion in 2021.

== Import ban ==
In late 2003, Japan suspended all imports of American beef due to a single BSE case in Washington. Japan had been the largest export market for US beef, valued at $1.2 billion in 2003. In December 2005, Japan agreed to remove the restriction on importing US beef. However, in January imports stopped again because inspectors found banned cattle parts in a veal shipment from the U.S.

Japan again halted all imports of US beef in January 2006—just six weeks after the Japanese government began to allow boneless beef from animals younger than 21 months into Japan after a two-year ban—because of bone material found in a shipment of veal from New York State. US agriculture secretary Mike Johanns conceded that the shipment had violated the Japanese regulations. Hong Kong, South Korea and Singapore had quickly followed Japan's lead in relaxing the import restrictions. In 2003, Japan accounted for $1.4 billion of the $3.9 billion in global sales of American beef and meat products; there had been two cases of BSE in the United States and 21 cases in Japan at the time. On 27 July 2006, Japan lifted the ban on imports of beef from cattle 20 months of age and younger. In order to protect Japanese consumers from mad cow disease, only meat from cattle that is less than 21 months old is accepted; and spinal cords, vertebrae, brains and bone marrow must be removed.

Michiko Kamiyama from Food Safety Citizen Watch and Yoko Tomiyama, Consumers Union of Japan, said about this: "The government has put priority on the political schedule between the two countries, not on food safety or human health." In 2005, CUJ was highly critical of the resumption of imports to Japan of beef from the United States due to fears about BSE. "This conclusion was made politically and hastily in response to the American demand that we resume beef imports from the United States," said Yasuaki Yamaura to CBS News.

== Lifting of import ban ==
On 17 May 2019, the United States and Japan struck a trade deal to lift the beef import ban, clearing the way for U.S. products to enter the market regardless of age. U.S. agriculture secretary Sonny Perdue hailed the trade deal, stating "This is great news for American ranchers and exporters who now have full access to the Japanese market for their high-quality, safe, wholesome, and delicious U.S. beef." "We are hopeful that Japan’s decision will help lead other markets around the world toward science-based policies," Perdue added.

American beef sales to Japan topped $2 billion in 2018, representing approximately one-fourth of all U.S. beef exports. The U.S. Meat Export Federation estimates that expanded access without the age restrictions could increase U.S. beef sales to Japan 7% to 10%, or by $150 million to $200 million annually. It said the ability of the industry to use beef from over-30-month cattle also will lower costs for companies exporting processed beef products to Japan.

The 2019 trade deal provided a timeline to lower or remove many of Japan's tariffs on American beef. A further agreement was put in place in 2022 to decrease the threat of beef trade interruptions between the countries. Exports of U.S. beef to Japan totaled almost $2.4 billion in 2021, out of global sales of beef and beef product exports from the United States valued at more than $10 billion.

== See also ==
- Japan–United States relations
- US beef imports in South Korea
- US beef imports in Taiwan
- Bovine spongiform encephalopathy (mad cow disease)
- Creutzfeldt–Jakob disease
- Trade barrier
