= Consumers Union of Japan =

Japanese non-profit organization

Consumers Union of Japan (日本消費者連盟) or CUJ was founded in 1969 by Takeuchi Naokazu. CUJ is certified as a non-profit organization by Japan's NPO legislation. CUJ publishes "Consumer Report" as a member newsletter, as well as online services in Japanese and English.

CUJ has been an associate member of Consumers International since 1972, promoting consumer protection and activism in Japan, as well as internationally.

== History ==
In the 1970s CUJ invited US consumer advocate Ralph Nader to Japan for a workshop, as well as Anwar Fazal, the leading consumer activist in Asia. Early campaigns had a distinct focus on food safety and environmental concerns, including class action lawsuits against illegal oil industry cartels. CUJ was an early opponent of nuclear power and food irradiation in Japan, holding various events throughout the country during the anti-nuclear power action week in 1977. CUJ has supported the campaign to stop the Rokkasho Reprocessing Plant in the Aomori Prefecture.

In 1982, CUJ called for an end to liberalization of agricultural products. The campaign was called, "Yes to Complete Grain Self-sufficiency" and in 1985 CUJ organized meetings of rice farmers and consumers to discuss how to protect rice production in Japan from pressure to liberalize Japan's rice market, in order to restore Japan's food self-sufficiency.

In 2018, CUJ campaigned against the Trans Pacific Partnership (TPP) trade agreement, with an op-ed signed by Ralph Nader and Koa Tasaka in Asahi Shimbun:

As consumer movement leaders in the U.S. and Japan, we agree that it is crucial that both countries prioritize consumer interests. However, we strongly disagree with the editorial’s unsupported assumption that the Trans-Pacific Partnership (TPP) as it is currently being negotiated would benefit consumers. What is important to consumers? Healthy and safe food. Banking and insurance services that protect their financial well-being. Affordable medicines and health care. Access to an open Internet and privacy protections. A clean environment. From what we know about the TPP text, it would undermine these critical consumer priorities, not promote them.

== Genetically modified food ==
Since 1996, CUJ has been the center of the opposition to genetically modified food (GMO) in Japan, starting the "No! GMO" Campaign, and demanding mandatory labeling of all GMO foods.

CUJ has campaigned against gene-edited foods being released without mandatory risk assessment or labeling, arguing that they are also GMO foods. In what may have been the world's first protest against a genome edited GMO food product, the GABA tomato, activists from Consumers Union of Japan and the No! GMO Campaign gathered outside Sanatech's offices in central Tokyo, Japan on 23 December 2020. Almost 500,000 people signed CUJ's petition demanding regulation of gene-edited foods in 2020.

== BSE controversy ==
In 2005, CUJ was highly critical of the resumption of imports to Japan of beef from the United States due to fears about BSE.

US beef imports in Japan were stopped from the United States in December 2003. In December 2005, Japan once again allowed imports of U.S. beef, but reinstated the ban in January 2006 after a technical violation of the U.S.-Japan beef import agreement.

Michiko Kamiyama from Food Safety Citizen Watch and Yoko Tomiyama, Consumers Union of Japan, said about this: "The government has put priority on the political schedule between the two countries, not on food safety or human health."
