= United States beef imports in South Korea =

United States beef imports in South Korea made up a $504 million industry for the American beef industry in 2010. The import of U.S. beef was banned in 2003 in South Korea and in other nations after a case of bovine spongiform encephalopathy was discovered in the United States. At the time, South Korea was the third-largest purchaser of U.S. beef exports, with an estimated market value of $815 million. After a number of failed attempts at reopening the Korean market, imports finally resumed in July 2008 leading to the massive 2008 US beef protest in South Korea. In 2010, South Korea again became the world's third largest U.S. beef importer.

== Import ban ==
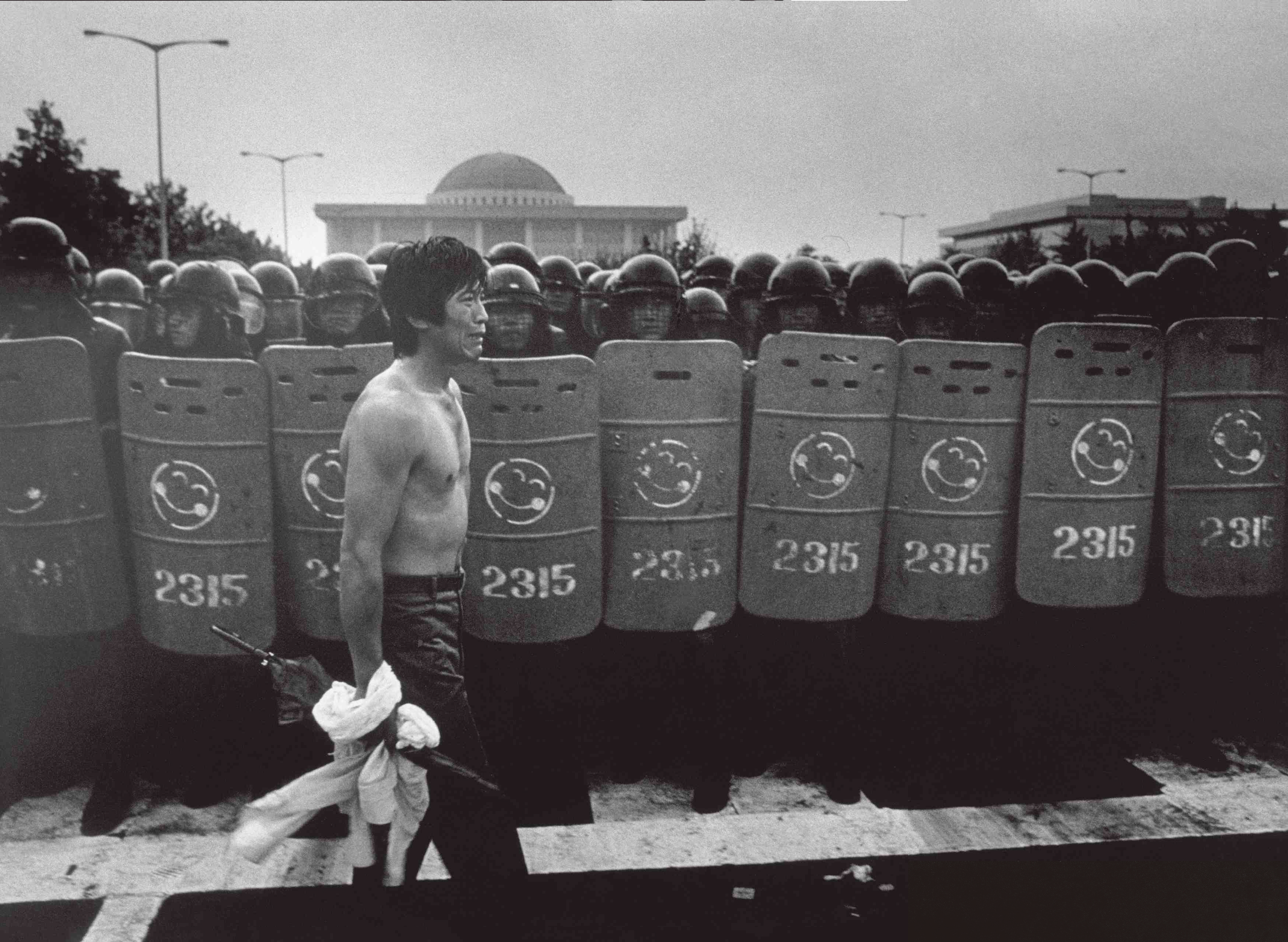
Farmer protesting the lifting of the import ban of American beef in front of the National Assembly in 1988

The Government of South Korea banned imports of U.S. beef in 2003 when a case of bovine spongiform encephalopathy, or mad cow disease was discovered in a cow in Washington. By 2006, the United States Department of Agriculture would confirm a total of three cases of BSE-infected cattle, two raised domestically, and one imported from Canada. At the time, South Korea was the third-largest purchaser of US beef exports, with an estimated market value of $815 million. An early attempt to reopen the Korean market in the fall of 2006 failed when the Korean government discovered bone chips in the shipment. Sporadic attempts made in the following year also failed for similar reasons.

== Protests ==
Throughout the ban, domestic beef farmers and local activists opposed re-opening of the market to U.S. claiming that American beef would cause mad cow disease. When the Lotte Department Store attempted to sell US beef in July 2007 during the Roh Moo-hyun administration, local activists stormed the meat counters and hurled cow dung at department store workers, abruptly terminating the resumption of sales. When President Lee Myung-bak assumed office in February 2008, it was widely expected that he would relax the ban on US beef as part of the process of ratification for the South Korea – United States Free Trade Agreement concluded by his predecessor, Roh Moo-hyun. Lee Myung-bak's attempt to reopen the Korean market to US beef along with protests against the Free Trade Agreement led to the country's largest anti-government protests in 20 years.

== Lifting of import ban ==
Despite the protests, US beef imports resumed on 1 July 2008. On 2 July 2008, Han Seung-soo, Prime Minister of South Korea bought 260,000 won worth of U.S. steak to eat with his family at his official residence to alleviate public worries about US beef. Imports of U.S. beef grew throughout 2008. During that year, Australian beef accounted for 60% (12,753 tons) of a total 21,184 tons of imported beef, but U.S. beef became the second largest supplier of foreign beef with 20% (4,439 tons). With continued import growth since the lifting of the ban, in 2010, South Korea surpassed US beef imports in Japan for the first time to become the largest market for U.S. beef in Asia.

In 2012 South Korea ramped up inspections of U.S. beef imports following the U.S. government's confirmation of a fourth case of BSE but did not halt imports. South Korea ended the special inspections two months later.

== See also ==
- 2008 US beef protest in South Korea
- South Korea – United States relations
