= Brian Haw =

English protester and peace campaigner (1949–2011)

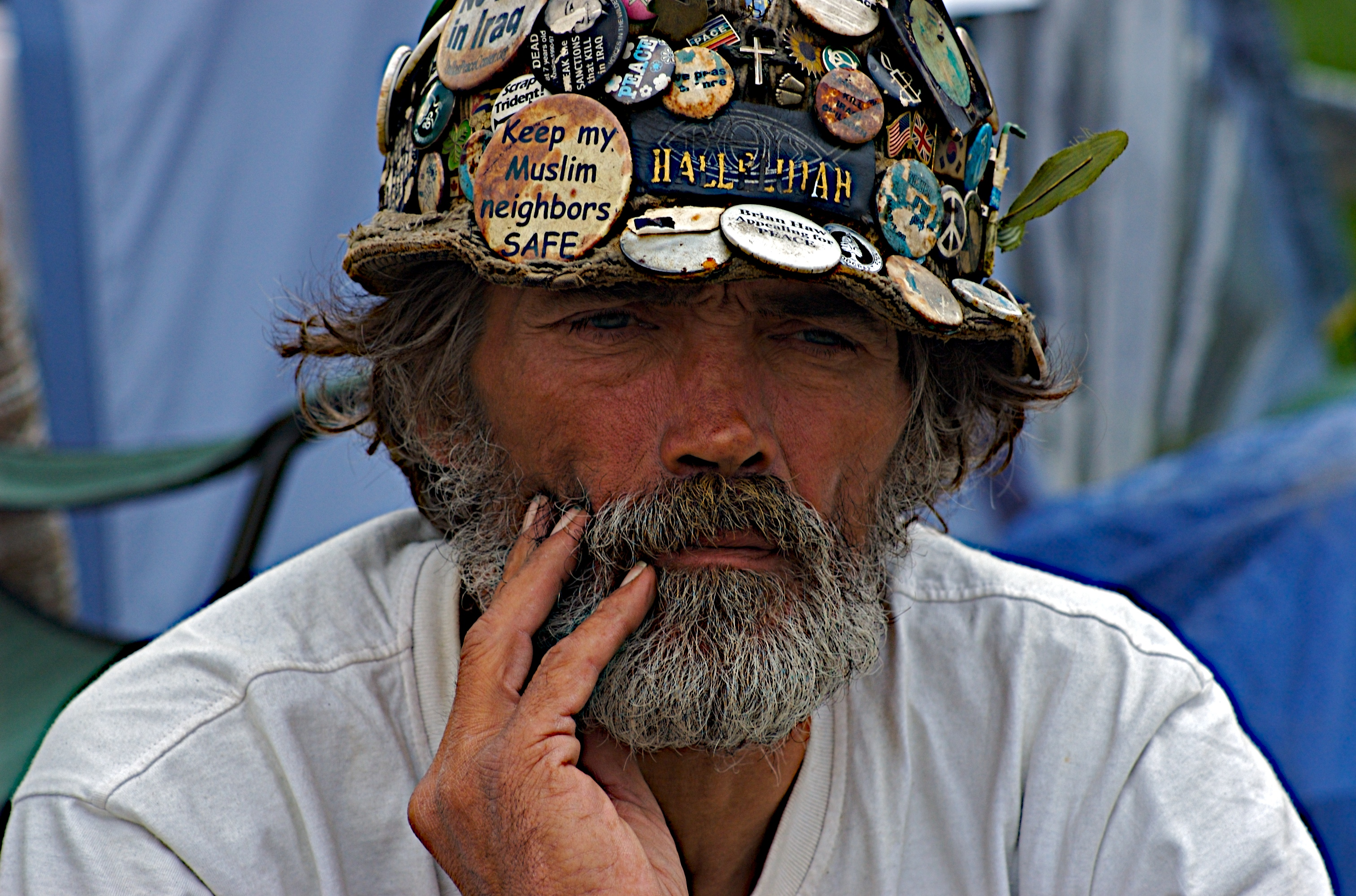
- Haw in August 2007
- Born: Brian William Haw; 7 January 1949; Wanstead Hospital, Woodford Green, Essex, Britain
- Died: 18 June 2011 (aged 62); Berlin, Germany
- Known for: Activism
- Spouse: Kay Haw (m. 1977; div. 2003)
- Children: 7

Brian William Haw (7 January 1949 – 18 June 2011) was a British protester and peace campaigner who lived for almost ten years from 2001 in a peace camp in London's Parliament Square, in a protest against UK and US foreign policy. He began the Parliament Square Peace Campaign before the September 11 attacks, and became a symbol of the anti-war movement over the policies of both the United Kingdom and the United States in Afghanistan and later Iraq. At the 2007 Channel 4 Political Awards he was voted Most Inspiring Political Figure. Haw died of cancer in Berlin, where he had been receiving medical treatment.

== Early and personal life ==
Haw was born on 7 January 1949, in Wanstead Hospital, in Woodford Green, Essex a twin and the eldest of six. He grew up in neighbouring Barking and in Whitstable, Kent.

His father, Robert William Haw (1925–1964), served as a sniper in the Reconnaissance Corps in the Second World War, and had been one of the first British soldiers to enter the Bergen-Belsen concentration camp. He later worked as a railway clerk, and also worked in a betting office. He died of suicide when Haw was 13. Haw's mother was Iris Marie Haw (née Hall).

Haw's family were involved in an evangelical Christian church in Whitstable, which Haw joined when he was aged 11. Haw was apprenticed to a boat-builder from the age of 16 and then entered the Merchant Navy as a deckhand. He travelled widely before spending six months at an evangelical college in Nottingham, after which he preached world peace. Haw visited Northern Ireland in 1970 during The Troubles, as well as the Killing Fields of Cambodia in 1989.

After returning to London, he worked as a removals man and as a carpenter, and later with youth in Redditch, Worcestershire. He married his wife Kay in Redbridge in June 1977. They lived in Redditch with their seven children until he left them in 2001 to begin his Parliament Square protest. The couple divorced in 2003.

== Parliament Square protests ==
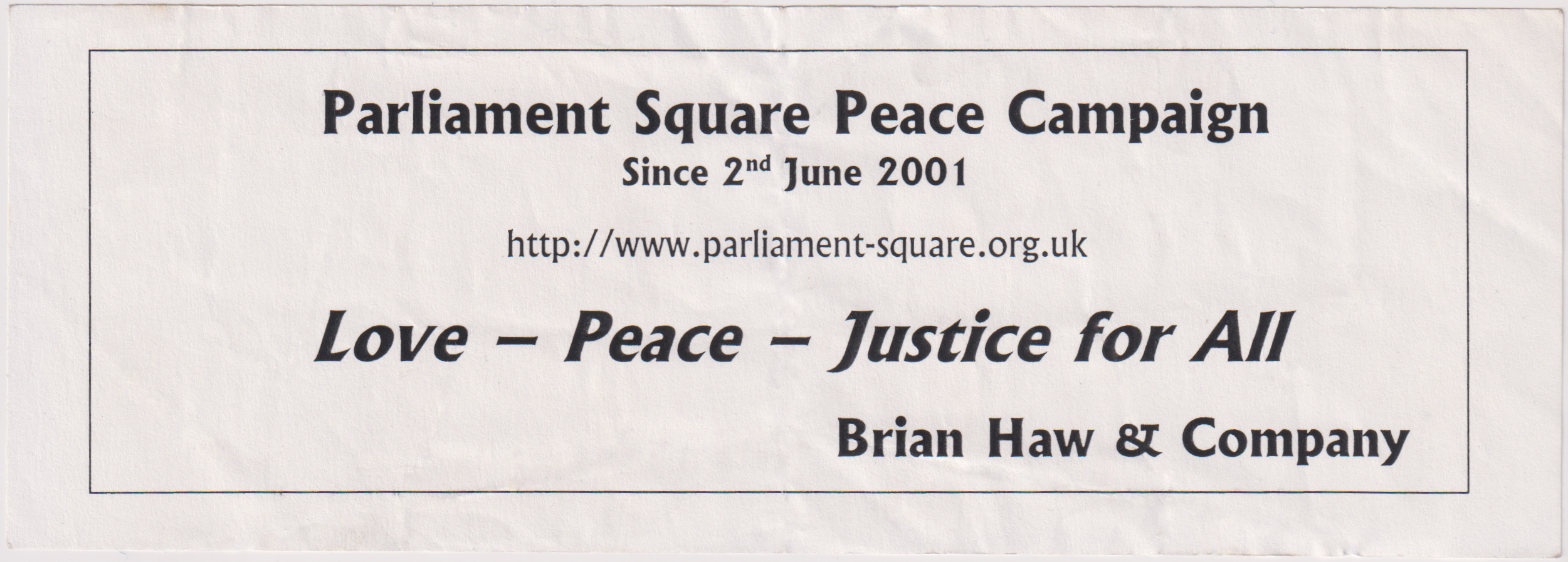
Flyer for Haw's Parliament Square Peace Campaign

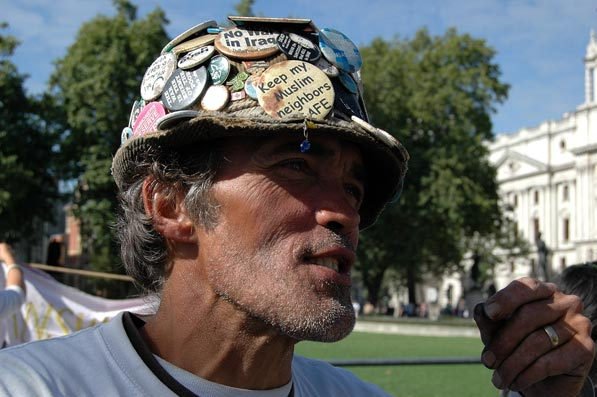
Haw in September 2005

On 2 June 2001, he began camping in Parliament Square in central London in a one-man political protest against war and foreign policy (initially, the Economic sanctions against Iraq). By his own account, he was first inspired to take up his vigil after seeing the images and information produced by the Mariam Appeal, an anti-sanctions campaign. Haw justified his campaign on a need to improve his children's future. He only left his makeshift campsite to attend court hearings, surviving on food brought by supporters. Support for Haw's protest came from former Labour cabinet minister Tony Benn and activist/comedian Mark Thomas. Among the artwork displayed was a Banksy stencil of two soldiers painting over a peace sign and Leon Kuhn's anti-war political caricature 3 Guilty Men, which, together with Kuhn's The Proud Parents, Mark Wallinger later displayed in his recreation at the Tate in 2007.

He originally camped on the grass in Parliament Square, but the Greater London Authority took legal action to remove him, so he relocated to the pavement, which was administered by Westminster City Council instead. In October 2002 Westminster City Council attempted to prosecute Haw for causing an obstruction to the pavement, but the case failed as Haw's banners did not impede movement. The continuous use of a megaphone by Haw led to objections by Members of Parliament who had offices close to Haw's protest camp. The House of Commons Procedure Committee held a brief inquiry in summer 2003 which heard evidence that permanent protests in Parliament Square could provide an opportunity for terrorists to disguise explosive devices, and resulted in a recommendation that the law be changed to prohibit them. The Government passed a provision banning all unlicensed protests, permanent or otherwise, in the Serious Organised Crime and Police Act 2005 (sections 132 to 138); however, because Haw's protest was on-going and residing on Parliament Square prior to the enactment of the Act, it was unclear whether the Act applied to him.

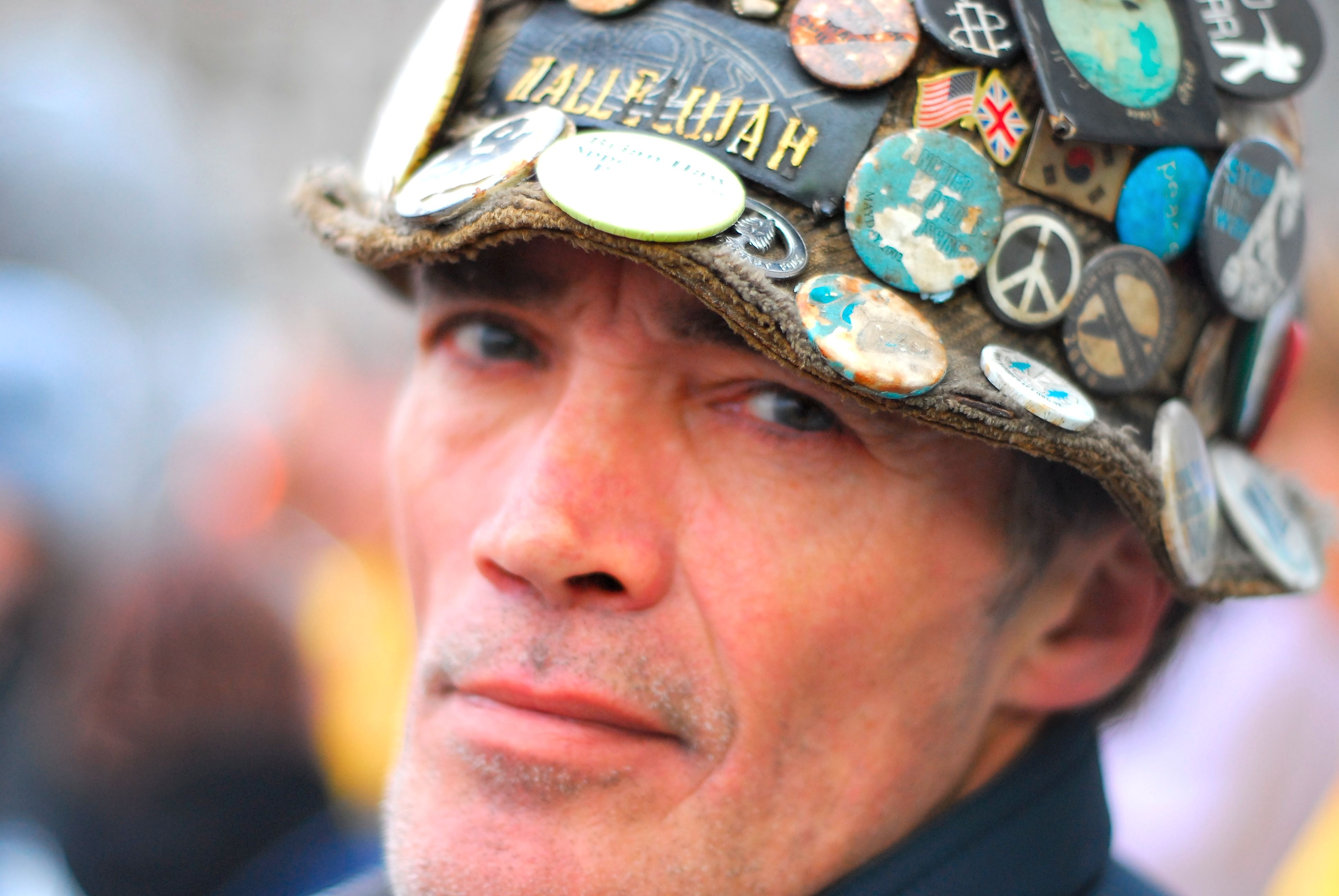
Haw in February 2007

In the 2005 general election Haw stood as a candidate in the Cities of London and Westminster in order to further his campaign and oppose the Act which was yet to come into force. He won 298 votes (0.8 per cent), making a speech against the ongoing presence of UK troops in Iraq at the declaration of the result.

=== Legal action ===
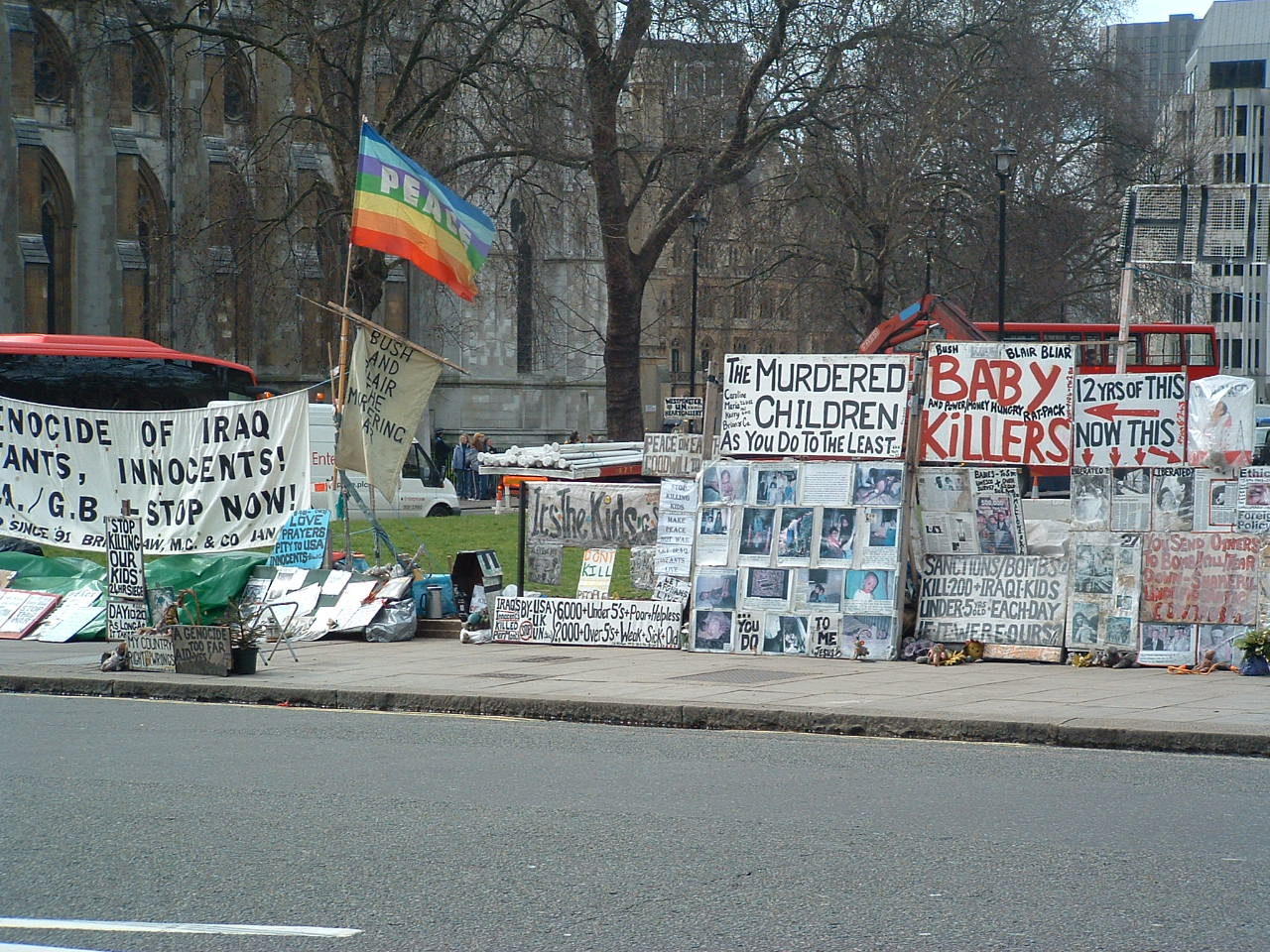
Brian Haw's Parliament Square Peace Campaign, January 2002

As preparation for implementing the new Serious Organised Crime and Police Act 2005 began, Haw won an application for judicial review on 28 July 2005, successfully arguing that a technical defect in the act meant it did not apply in his case. The act states that demonstrations must have authorisation from the police "when the demonstration starts", and Haw asserted that his demonstration had begun before the passage of the act, which was not made retrospective. Although the commencement order made to bring the act into force had made reference to demonstrations begun before the act came into force, there was no power for the commencement order to extend the scope of the act.

The government appealed against the judgement, and on 8 May 2006 the Court of Appeal allowed the appeal and therefore declared that the act did apply to him. The court found that the intent of parliament was clearly to apply to all demonstrations in Parliament Square regardless of when they had begun, saying "The only sensible conclusion to reach in these circumstances is that Parliament intended that those sections of the Act should apply to a demonstration in the designated area, whether it started before or after they came into force. Any other conclusion would be wholly irrational and could fairly be described as manifestly absurd."

In the meantime Haw had applied for permission to continue his demonstration, and received it on condition that his display of placards was no more than 3 metres (9.8 ft) wide (among other things). Haw was unwilling to comply and the police referred his case to the Crown Prosecution Service; a number of supporters began camping with him in order to deter attempts to evict him.

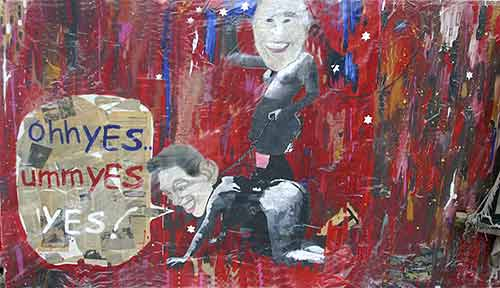
Foreign Policy 2000, a painting by Abby Jackson – one of the items confiscated by the police

In the early hours of 23 May 2006, 78 police arrived and removed all but one of Haw's placards citing continual breached conditions of the Serious Organised Crime and Police Act 2005 as their reason for doing so. Ian Blair (head of the Metropolitan Police at the time) later said that the operation to remove Haw's placards had cost £27,000. The actions of the police were criticised by members of the Metropolitan Police Authority at its monthly meeting on 25 May 2006. Haw appeared at Bow Street Magistrates' Court on 30 May, when he refused to enter a plea. The court entered a not guilty plea on his behalf, and he was bailed to return to court on 11 July 2006. At a licensing hearing at Westminster City Council on 30 June 2006, Haw was granted limited permission to use a loudspeaker in the space allowed to him.

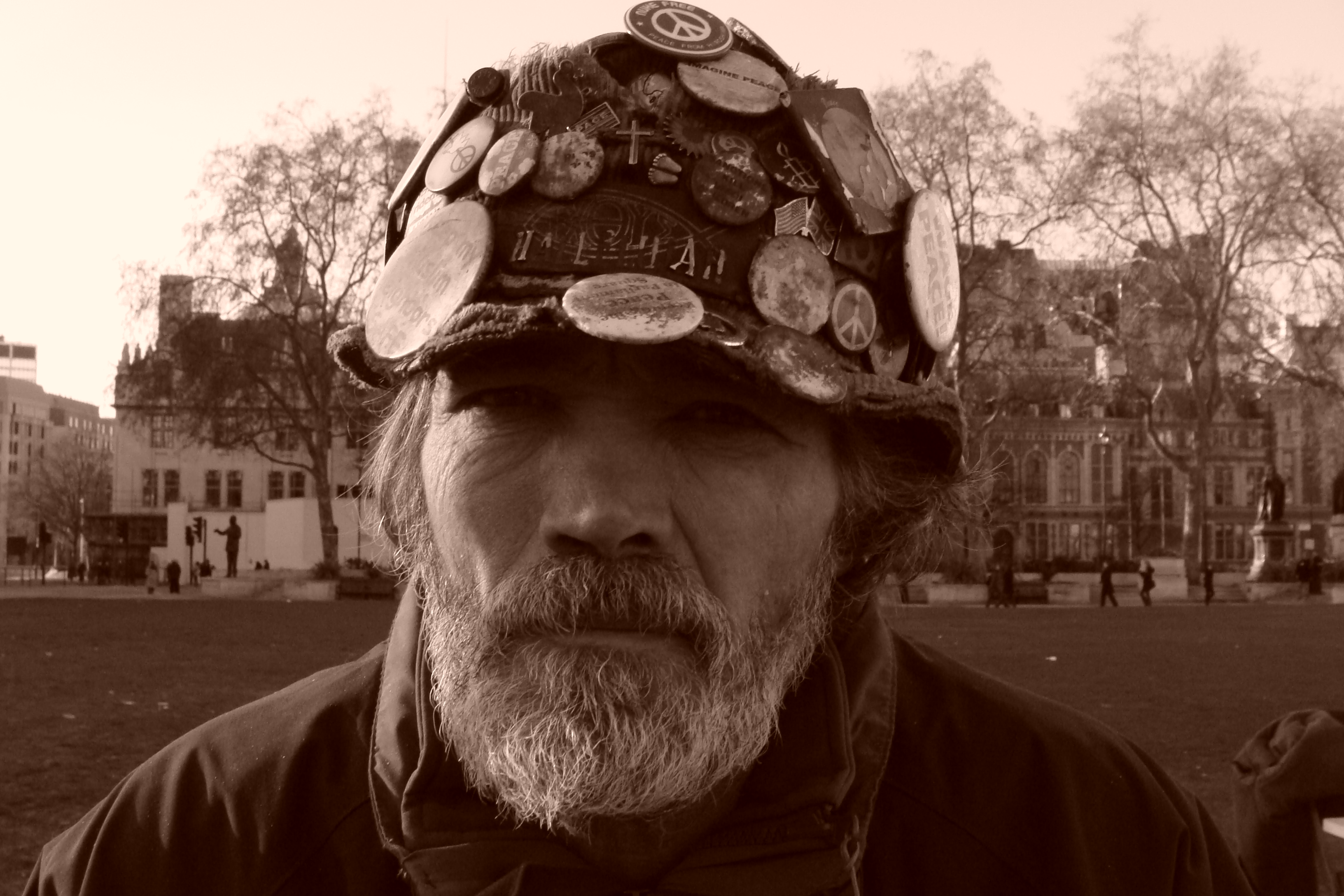
Haw in Parliament Square, 3 January 2009

On 22 January 2007 Haw was acquitted on the grounds that the conditions he was accused of breaching were not sufficiently clear, and that they should have been imposed by a police officer of higher rank. District Judge Purdy ruled: "I find the conditions, drafted as they are, lack clarity and are not workable in their current form." At the 2007 Channel 4 Political Awards Haw was voted Most Inspiring Political Figure.

== Director of Public Prosecutions v Haw ==
In the case of Director of Public Prosecutions v Haw, the judgement of the court, delivered by Lord Phillips CJ, included the following:

3. The issues raised by the case stated are as follows:

- i) Whether the statutory powers available to the Commissioner of Police under Section 134 of SOCA can be exercised by a subordinate on his behalf;
- ii) Whether the conditions imposed on Mr Haw were ultra vires, or incompatible with Articles 10 and 11 of the European Convention on Human Rights ('ECHR'), as unreasonable or insufficiently clear.

This was an adjourned hearing of an appeal by way of case stated by the Director of Public Prosecutions against a decision of District Judge Purdy in the City of Westminster Magistrates Court on 22 January 2007. The judge ruled that there was no case for the Respondent, Brian Haw, to answer on a charge of knowingly failing to comply with a condition imposed under Section 134 of the Serious Organised Crime and Police Act 2005 ('SOCA') in respect of a demonstration in Parliament Square. The hearing before the Administrative Court was adjourned because Mr Haw had not been served with relevant documents in time to give them proper consideration.

Haw sought a large number of directions from the court on 18 November 2008. After some delay the directions of the court were eventually published in March 2009:

- Haw, R (on the application of) v Southwark Crown Court & Ors [2009] EWHC 379 (Admin) (3 March 2009)

The court was un-persuaded that a full transcript of the hearing was necessary, even though Haw claimed that it would show that the court sidestepped the issue as to the legality of the seizure.

== Tucker v Director of Public Prosecutions ==
The case of Tucker v Director of Public Prosecutions, 2007 was an appeal by way of case stated. The appellant, Barbara Tucker, was convicted under Section 132 (1)(c) of the Serious Organised Crime and Police Act 2005 (SOCPA), of being within the jurisdiction of the Central Criminal Court, and carrying on unauthorised demonstration by herself in a public place in a designated area, namely Parliament Square. Her defence was that Haw had invited her to join him in his demonstration. He gave evidence on her behalf to that effect.

The magistrate said: "Had I accepted this evidence (which I did not) it would have been argued that the allegation that she had 'carried on an unauthorised demonstration by herself ...' could not have been made out, and furthermore (in my view incorrectly) that it would provide a defence by saying that as Mr Haw is safe from prosecution anyone who joins him is also safe." The question posed by the magistrate was: "Was it lawful under section 6 (1) HRA to convict the appellant?" The Administrative Court held that SOCPA was not incompatible with the European Convention on Human Rights (specifically, Articles 10 (freedom of expression) and 11 (freedom of assembly)), and that Tucker's conviction was therefore lawful.

== January 2008 injury and arrest ==
On 12 January 2008, Haw was observing a protest against the Serious Organised Crime and Police Act outside Downing Street. Seven people were arrested including Haw, who said "I was filming the students lying down in the road when one officer stepped forward, as I was walking back, and pushed the camera with his hand. It struck my face." He used "violent and humiliating force".

== 2008 London mayoral elections ==
In December 2007 press releases stated that Haw had declared himself a candidate in the London Mayoral Elections in May 2008, but eventually he did not stand. On 17 April 2008 he gave his support to the Christian Choice candidate Alan Craig.

== 25 May 2010 arrest ==
On 25 May 2010 the day of the State Opening of Parliament for the new Conservative-Liberal Democrat coalition government, Haw was arrested at 8:30 am.

== Illness and death ==
In September 2010 Haw was diagnosed with lung cancer. On 1 January 2011 he left England to receive treatment in Berlin. Haw, who was described as a chain smoker, continued to smoke cigarettes until his death. He died in Germany in the early hours of 18 June 2011 of lung cancer. He is survived by seven children.

Reacting to news of Haw's death, Tony Benn said "Brian Haw was a man of principle ... his death marks the end of a historic enterprise by a man who gave everything to support his beliefs". At his death Al Jazeera described him as an "unsung hero". Mark Wallinger said "I admired [Haw's] single-minded tenacity. His rectitude was a mirror that the people in the building opposite couldn't bear. ... Now that he's gone, who else have we got?". British artist Banksy honoured Haw with a tribute on his website. Banksy had previously described Haw as 'the best inspiration in London' in a hand written dedication to him in a copy of the book Wall and Piece.

== Memorials ==
In 2011 London Assembly Member Jenny Jones called for Westminster Council to erect a blue plaque for Brian Haw immediately, bypassing English Heritage's criteria that the person commemorated should have been dead for two decades or passed the centenary of their birth, whichever is the earlier.

In 2018, artist Guy Atkins sited an audio monument to Brian Haw in Parliament Square. Conceived within the tradition of countermonuments, the audio work - 'And There Was Brian' - can only be heard in the Square through the monument's GPS-restricted website, andtherewasbrian.uk. The monument gives an account of Brian Haw's protest through the experiences of his longest-serving supporter, actor Michael Culver.

Following Haw's death, the British MP John McDonnell called for a statue of Haw to be erected to celebrate peace. In 2023 actor Sir Mark Rylance headed a crowdfunding campaign to erect a small bronze maquette on a plinth opposite the big guns of the Imperial War Museum in Lambeth. Paid for by over £25,000 in contributions from more than one thousand people, a 72-centimetre (2 ft 4 in) bronze statue by Amanda Ward was installed at the School of Historical Dress, facing the Imperial War Museum and just outside the 1-mile exclusion zone around the Houses of Parliament. It was unveiled on 16 March 2025.

=== Documentaries ===
Haw was featured in several documentaries including 2003's "As Long As It Takes" (Raj Yagnik). Haw was briefly portrayed in the 2007 drama The Trial of Tony Blair.

Haw was filmed for many months by independent documentary maker Senara Wilson during the buildup to war in 2003. Her film Life of Brian (produced and edited by Matthew Platts-Mills) was selected for the Commonwealth Film Festival.

A Man Called Brian, a 2005 documentary film by Mahmoud Shoolizadeh, is about Haw and his protest in Parliament Square.

Haw was featured with activist Mick Meaney in a documentary by British independent news agency RINF, in which for the first time in the media he stated that he believed "9/11 was an inside job".

== In culture ==
In January 2007, former Turner Prize nominee Mark Wallinger recreated Brian Haw's Parliament Square protest in its entirety as an exhibition at Tate Britain, titled State Britain. Running the length of the Duveen Gallery, State Britain was a painstaking reconstruction of the display confiscated by the Metropolitan Police in 2006. It included 500 weather-worn banners, photos, peace flags, and messages from well-wishers collected by Haw over the duration of the Peace Protest, as well as his self-constructed shelter. In December 2007 Wallinger's work won the Turner Prize.

The London-based band XX Teens recorded a song "For Brian Haw", which was included on their 2008 album Welcome To Goon Island. The track incorporated a statement by Haw himself about his motivations for the protest.

Haw was featured in the short length documentary Maria: 24hr Peace Picket by Iranian film director Parviz Jahed, about fellow peace campaigner Maria Gallastegui.

In 2009, Youth Music Theatre UK developed the music theatre production According to Brian Haw... based on reactions by young people to Haw's life, 9/11 and the Iraq war. This was performed at the Barbican Theatre, Plymouth. This production was again performed in 2012 at Square Chapel Centre for the Arts in Halifax with a new cast of young people. It was developed from a concept by Eddie Latter, music by James Atherton, book and lyrics by Sarah Nelson, directed by Ellie Jones, movement by Eddie Latter, designed by Hannah Boothman.

Zia Trench's debut play, The State We're In, based on Haw's life, was performed for the first time at the 2009 Edinburgh Fringe, featuring Michael Byrne in the lead role and directed by Justin Butcher.

== See also ==
- Thomas, an American anti-nuclear activist who undertook a 27-year peace vigil in front of the White House
- Concepción Picciotto, a Spanish anti-nuclear activist who undertook a 35-year peace vigil in front of the White House, the longest continuous act of political protest in the United States
- List of peace activists
- Steve Bray, a UK Parliament stop Brexit protestor
