= Abby Jackson =

British artist

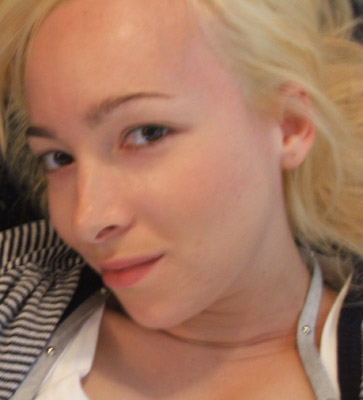
- Born: 1982 (age 43–44); North Devon, England
- Education: Somerset College of Art
- Known for: Painting
- Movement: Stuckism

Abby Jackson (born 1982) is a British artist, Stuckist painter, writer and art activist.

== Life and work ==
Abby Jackson was born in North Devon and lives and works in London. She attended Somerset College of Art and studied advertising. In 2002, as an act of rebellion during her last year at the college, she made a large painting Foreign Policy 2000 of President Bush's head on top of a bare breasted dominatrix whipping Tony Blair on all fours. The college threatened to fail her, but finally gave her a pass degree.

In 2005, Jackson joined the international Stuckism movement founded by Billy Childish and Charles Thomson in 1999 to promote painting and oppose conceptual art. She phoned Thomson "out of the blue" about a year after leaving college, where she had been told about the Stuckists in a visual culture lecture . Her work was in the Stuckist show, "Painting is the Medium of Yesterday" – Paul Myners, at La Viande gallery in Shoreditch in September 2005.

In 2006, she supported the Design and Artists Copyright Society (DACS) campaign for artists resale rights, taking part in a protest in Whitehall in January, and being one of the four artist representatives to present the petition to 10 Downing Street. She criticised David Hockney and other artists, who were opposed to the threshold being lowered to encompass emerging artists. In a letter in The Times, she said, "A Bill like this will encourage young artists to keep going, even when they can’t afford a studio or a takeaway at the weekend. I don’t want money to go towards a lavish wedding, I need it to continue painting."

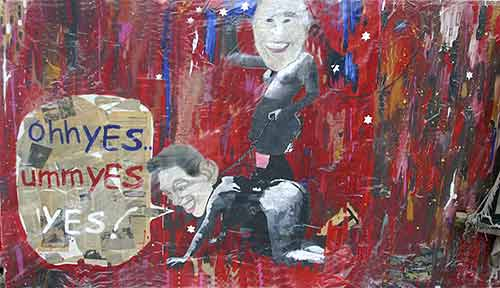
Foreign Policy 2000 by Abby Jackson, one of the images recreated in State Britain

Jackson's college painting, Foreign Policy 2000, had been exhibited after her graduation in the Wellington Club in London, where it was approved by both Arab clientele and Damien Hirst, a friend of the club owner. It was then stored under Jackson's bed, until her admiration for Brian Haw's Parliament Square peace protest display motivated her in 2006 to donate it to him. Most of Haw's display, including her painting and other art work (one by Banksy), was later removed by the Metropolitan Police in a dawn raid.

Jackson's painting was then copied by Mark Wallinger as part of his recreation of Haw's display; the recreation was exhibited as an installation, State Britain, which opened in January 2007 at Tate Britain and won the Turner Prize later that year. Jackson commented:

State Britain is a true metaphor of conceptual art, as it's fake. I feel that I and the other people who contributed to Brian's display are the original artists.

In 2006 she instigated and co-curated the first show of artists from the Saatchi Yourgallery website, Lost and Found: this took place at the Brick Lane Gallery in East London.

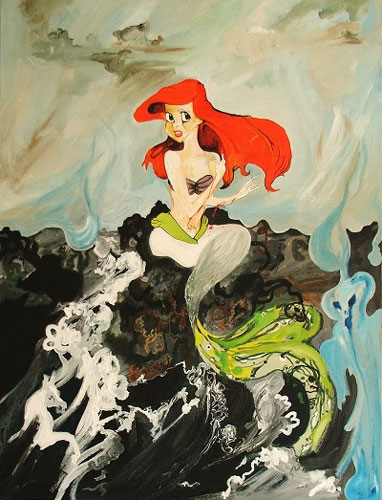
Death on the Rocks by Abby Jackson

Her writing has been published in The Face, The Hospital and Ditched. In "Still Life v Real Life" in Aesthetica, she contrasted the different responses of Stuckist artist Wolf Howard and Luc Tuymans to the subject of 9/11: "Tuymans chooses to avoid his subject matter, whereas Howard, as a Stuckist, approaches his subject head on."

She said of her own work:

I've taken elements from the childhood fairy tale and the contemporary fairy tale of the celebrity lifestyle, merging the two ideas into work such as Death of the Rocks, which portrays the Disney Little Mermaid slitting her wrists.

She has had solo shows at the Adam Street Gallery and Diorama Gallery, and group shows by West Eleven Gallery, Artshole, Wimbledon Art Studios, Islington Arts Fair, Stephen Lawrence Gallery (in association with BBC Africa 05), and Peace Camp (curated by Bob and Roberta Smith). In February 2008, she is staging a joint exhibition, called Disney Heroines Committing Suicide, with Mark D at La Viande gallery in Shoreditch, London.

== Gallery ==
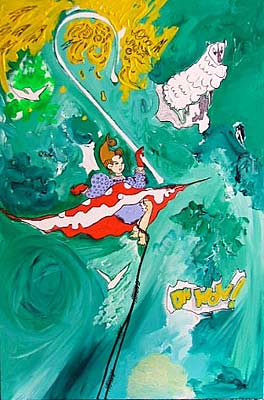
Oh Wow! by Abby Jackson

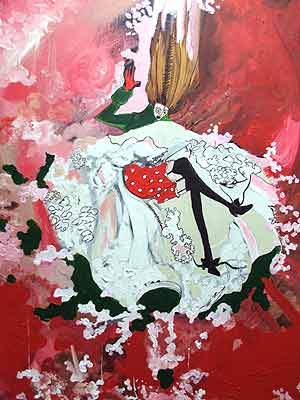
My Secret Garden

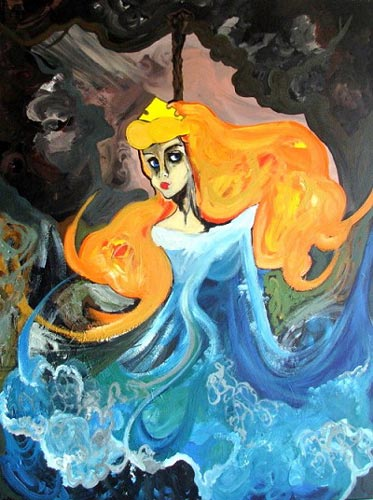
Death On the Rope

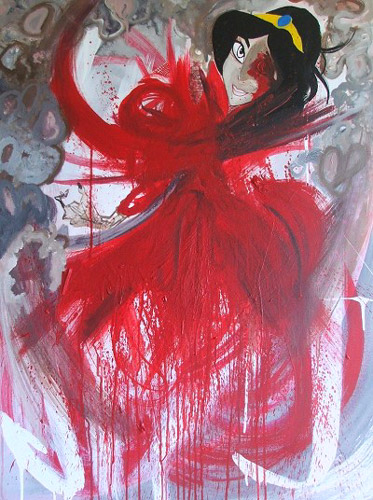
Shock and Awe
