= State Britain =

Artwork by Mark Wallinger

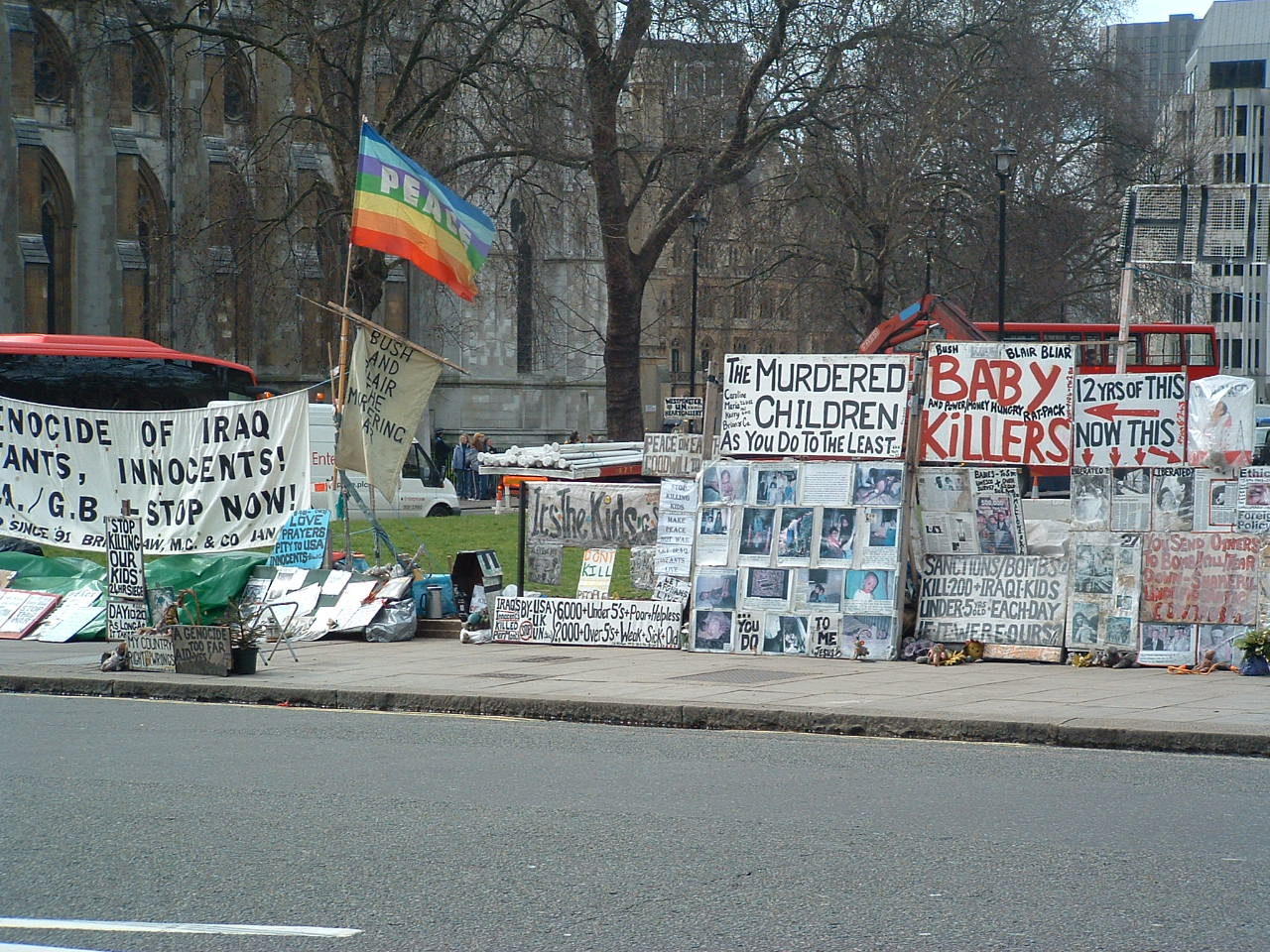
The original display, which State Britain recreates.

State Britain is an installation artwork by Mark Wallinger displayed in Tate Britain in January 2007. It is a recreation from scratch of a protest display about the treatment of Iraq, set up by Brian Haw outside Parliament and eventually confiscated by the police. Haw's display contained several hundred items donated by members of the public. As well as continuing the protest, Wallinger's recreation in a different context also brings up questions of authenticity. Wallinger won the Turner Prize in 2007 for this piece.

== Description ==
State Britain is a meticulous recreation of a 40-metre long display which had originally been situated around peace campaigner Brian Haw's protest outside the Houses of Parliament against policies towards Iraq.

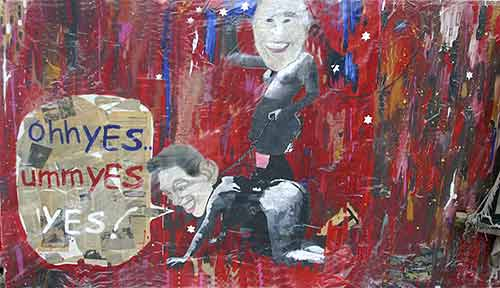
Foreign Policy 2000 by Abby Jackson, one of the images in Haw's display recreated by Mark Wallinger in State Britain.

The original display consisted of over 600 items, many donations from the public, including paintings, placards, photos of families, banners, posters, graffiti, traffic cones, tarpaulins, temporary fencing and toys. These included a poster, "Blair Lies, Kids Die!", a banner, "Baby Killers", photos of babies maimed and burnt in missile attacks, a statement that parliament spent seven hours discussing the war in Iraq and 700 hours discussing fox-hunting, and a white teddy bear holding a sign, "Bears against bombs". In the centre is an image of Haw fixed to a wooden cross and wearing a T-shirt that says, "Bliar". Also displayed was a Banksy stencil of two soldiers painting a peace sign next to Leon Kuhn's anti-war political caricature 3 Guilty Men, both of which, together with Kuhn's The Proud Parents, Mark Wallinger later displayed in his recreation at the Tate in 2007.

The original display, apart from a three-metre section, was confiscated by the police under the Serious Organised Crime and Police Act 2005, which prohibits unauthorised protests in a specified "exclusion zone" around Parliament.

State Britain was meticulously researched and recreated by project lead Michelle Sadgrove (Pilkington) at Mike Smith Studio who sourced 15 artists from varying backgrounds and skillsets to work alongside her over a period of 6 months, exploring participant observation and using hundreds of photographs to match each item to the original protest display. In all, over one thousand five hundred objects were created or sourced for the piece. It cost Tate Britain £90,000 as part of their exhibition programme and was installed inside the Duveen Hall of Tate Britain in January 2007. Signs at all the entrances to the hall warn that the exhibit contains images of extreme human suffering. Michelle has since led teams of technicians installing the work at Mac/Val Paris, Aargauer Kunsthaus, Switzerland, Der Kunstverein Seit 1817 Hamburg, Museum De Pont Tilburg Netherlands and ZKM Karlsruhe Germany.

The Sunday Times saw the show as more indication that the arts establishment had turned against the Labour government. It contrasted Tate director Sir Nicholas Serota's endorsement of Wallinger's show with the private tour of Tate Modern Serota had given to Prime Minister Tony Blair in 2000. At that time Blair's government had courted Young British Artists such as Tracey Emin and Damien Hirst to help "modernise" Britain.

State Britain was curated in collaboration with Wallinger by Tate curator, Clarrie Wallis. It was on show until 27 August 2007.

Wallinger was shortlisted for the Turner Prize on 8 May 2007 for State Britain, and announced the winner on 3 December 2007.

== Exclusion zone ==
The Tate press release on the exhibition mentioned that the Serious Organised Crime and Police Act 2005 prohibited "unauthorised demonstrations within a one kilometre radius of Parliament Square" and that this radius passed through the Duveen Hall, bisecting Wallinger's exhibit. Wallinger marked this on the floor with a black line running through the Tate. Initial press reports dwelt on the potential dangers of this infringement, speculating that the police might even remove the half of the exhibit on the "wrong side of the line". However, Charles Thomson of the Stuckists pointed out the exclusion zone ended at Thorney Street, 300 yards before the Tate. The one kilometre radius is the maximum possible, but not actual, area of the designated zone, which is mapped out by particular streets.

== Critiques ==
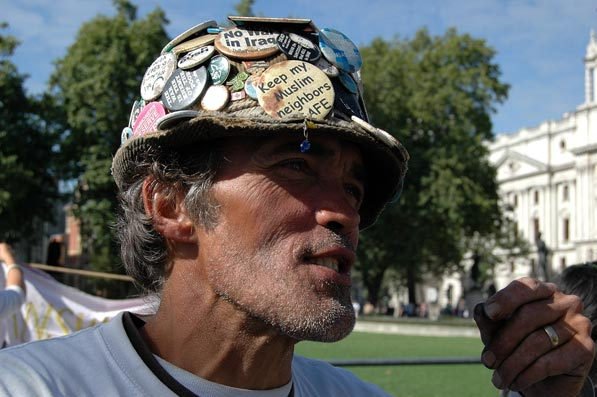
Brian Haw

A few days before the opening of the exhibit, Brian Haw said he knew nothing about it, but that "What we had ... were pieces of art." He was invited to view the work while it was being installed and was pleased with the result.

Tim Teeman commented that Wallinger created the exhibit not only to bring what he perceives as a dangerous erosion of civil liberties to light, but also to examine whether the installation was art or politics; Teeman concluded that it was obviously both. Waldemar Januszczak commented on "a cheeky intervention that raises lots of interesting questions," but that these were about "issues of originality and authenticity", rather than the original political intent of the display. Edward Lucie-Smith called it "official art" and considered that Haw, not Wallinger, should receive the credit.
