= De Pont Museum of Contemporary Art =

Museum De Pont
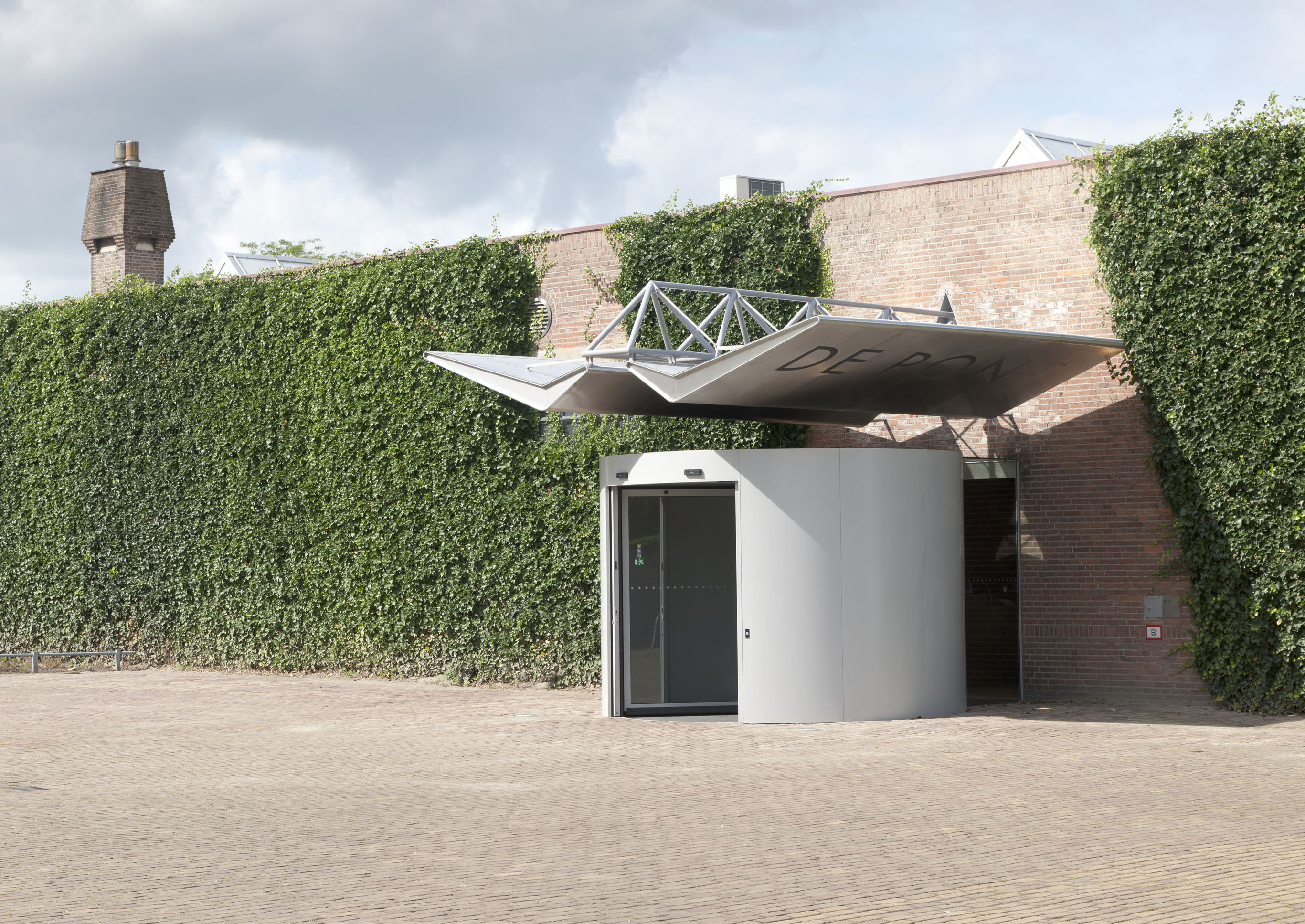
- Entrance Museum De Pont

- Location within Netherlands
- Established: 1992
- Location: Wilhelminapark 1, 5041 EA Tilburg, North Brabant, Netherlands
- Coordinates: 51.5674°N 5.0750°E
- Type: Museum of modern and contemporary art
- Director: Martijn van Nieuwenhuyzen
- Architect: Benthem Crouwel Architekten
- Website: www.depont.nl

The De Pont Museum is a contemporary art museum in Tilburg, North Brabant, the Netherlands. It was named after the lawyer and businessman Jan de Pont (1915-1987). After his death his estate provided for the establishment of a foundation (the Janivo Stichting) to stimulate contemporary visual art. With its founding director Hendrik Driessen, the decision was made to transform a Tilburg wool-spinning mill into a museum. Since its opening in 1992, the collection has grown to include more than 800 works by approximately eighty nationally and internationally known artists, among them Marlene Dumas, Bill Viola and Anish Kapoor.

== History ==
De Pont had decided that part of his estate was to be used to stimulate contemporary art, but left it up to the board of the new foundation to determine how and where that would take shape. This created the exceptional situation of a private ‘museum’ (director Hendrik Driessen avoided this term for the first couple of years, in the belief that one has to earn such a title) that did not begin with a collection bequeathed by the founder, and which made no appeal for support from government organizations or funds. That financial independence continues to exist to this day.

The museum's location of Tilburg was also related Jan de Pont. He was a former resident of this city, and concerned about the fate of the vanishing textile industry. During the 1960s, de Pont had helped the Thomas de Beer wool-spinning mill to get back on its feet after bankruptcy. Twenty years later the business could eventually no longer compete with corporations abroad; operations were discontinued. This conveniently coincided with the foundation's search for suitable building. The property was acquired for a symbolic amount, and four of the six remaining employees of the mill were hired by the foundation.

The architect Benthem Crouwel was appointed to refurbish the mill and the De Pont opened its doors on September 12, 1992. Since then, the museum has expanded both its collection and its building. Since 2016 photography and video art have been displayed in the museum's new wing specially designed for this purpose (also designed by Benthem Crouwel).

Hendrik Driessen retired in June 2019, passing on the directorship to Martijn van Nieuwenhuyzen.

== Collection ==
Since De Pont Foundation had no collection from the start, its acquisition policy could be determined beforehand. It was decided that there would be no focus on a specific generation, art-historical movement or social ideology, nor on a specific art form. The only stipulation was that the artworks were to be created by living artists. The visual strength of the artwork itself was the sole focus.

After the acquisition of a small painting of Rob Birza (Untitled (The Hand)) was approved by the board, Hendrik Driessen soon started to collect some large and iconic art works, such as Richard Long's Planet Circle and The First People by Marlene Dumas. Four artists with distinct reputations in contemporary art - James Turrell, Gerhard Merz, Richard Serra and Richard Long – were asked to produce a work in situ for the first presentation of the collection.

The museum had set a goal to collect in terms of depth rather than breadth, meaning that the acquisition policy involved following a limited number of artists over a longer period of time, with the intention of collecting 'key works' within a body of work that could represent the essence of that artist's outlook. In order to achieve that, distinct choices had to be made; and so the collection has grown in a relatively slow manner. Over the years the museum has come to own roughly 800 works, more than half of which is photography or work on paper, by eighty different artists. A number of them— including Berlinde De Bruyckere, Thierry De Cordier, Anton Henning, Roni Horn, Anri Sala, Fiona Tan, Robert Therrien, Rosemarie Trockel, Luc Tuymans and Mark Wallinger — were introduced to the Netherlands or given their first major exhibition by De Pont. The museum has consistently shown three major exhibitions a year highlighting the oeuvre of one of the artists from the collection. In addition, there are smaller solo exhibitions in the ‘podium space’ that are not directly related to the collection.

Among the masterpieces in the collection are Grapes (Ai WeiWei), Vertigo (Anish Kapoor), Planet Circle (Richard Long), Palpebre (Giuseppe Penone), Hermes Trismegistos I-IV (Sigmar Polke), Black Drawings (Marlene Dumas), Gutter Splash Two Corner Cast (Richard Serra), Große Geister (Thomas Schütte), The Greeting (Bill Viola) and Wachsraum (Wolfgang Laib).

Exhibition Highlights:

- Richard Long (2019)
- Ann Veronica Janssens (2018-2019)
- Anne & Patrick Poirier (2018-2019)
- Rineke Dijkstra (2018 and 2011)
- Callum Innes (2016-2017)
- Dan Graham (2014)
- David Claerbout (2009 and 2016–2017)
- Ai Weiwei (2012)
- Mark Wallinger (2011-2012)
- Giuseppe Penone (1997-1998 and 2010–2011)
- Bill Viola (2004-2005 and 2009–2010)
- René Daniëls (2007 and 2016–2017)
- Keith Tyson (2007)
- Robert Zandvliet (1997-1998 and 2005–2006)
- Michel François (2004)
- Fiona Tan (2003, 2009 and 2017)
- Marlene Dumas (2002)
- Berlinde de Bruyckere (2000-2001, 2005 and 2012)
- Gerhard Richter (2000 and 2008–2009)
- Marc Mulders (1999-2000 and 2008–2009)
- Tacita Dean (1998-1999, 2010-2011 and 2019–2020)
- Christian Boltanski (1996-1997)
- Luc Tuymans (1995-1996 and 2019)
- Anish Kapoor (1995 and 2012–2013)
- Roni Horn (1994, 1998 and 2016)
- Jeff Wall (1994-1995)

== The building ==
The museum is housed in a former wool mill in Tilburg. Apart from the Hallen für Neue Kunst in Schaffhausen, De Pont was among the first museums to be housed in a formerly industrial space, thus setting an example for future museums, most notably serving as an inspiration during the planning stages of Tate Modern in London. The building had all the distinguishing characteristics of a Dutch factory: functionally and technically, it comprised no more than was absolutely necessary. This is why the roof and the floor of the large hall were completely renovated and all the walls restored. Benthem Crouwel Architects, however, maintained the factory's original character as the point of departure. The firm's six-month renovation resulted in a distinctive and widely praised museum building with both a spacious exhibition space and small wool-storage rooms, suitable for a more intimate encounter with the art.

Since the opening, the museum has been expanded several times: with the addition of a project space and an auditorium in 2002, and with a completely new exhibition space of 1100 square meters in 2016. This ‘New Wing’, once again carried out by Benthem Crouwel Architects, was specially designed to accommodate film, video art, photography and works on paper. The same renovation also included an expansion of the restaurant and a new salon designed by Anton Henning.

The museum's forecourt is dubbed Meester J.H. de Pontplein after the founder. On the occasion of the museum's twentieth anniversary in 2012, the municipality of Tilburg adorned its street side with an entrance gate consisting of several connected passages. Five years later, Anish Kapoor designed Sky Mirror (for Hendrik), for the museum's twenty-fifth anniversary. This characteristic free-standing mirror, reflecting the sky, is the first Kapoor to be placed in Dutch public space. It is surrounded by a garden designed by landscape architect Sophie Walker, completing the museum's characteristic entrance.
