= RINF =

RINF Alternative News is an independent news agency and television show based in Lancaster, in the United Kingdom.

Established in 2004, it presents a counter-view to mainstream news and publishes news reports from investigative journalists.

In 2007 it published a video by peace activist Brian Haw repeating a conspiracy theory that the American government was behind the events of 9/11.

The website has organised real world events featuring authors and speakers, including William Rodriguez. , Annie Machon and Webster Tarpley.
