= Robert Therrien =

American sculptor (1947–2019)

- Born: Robert Edward Therrien; November 17, 1947; Chicago, Illinois, U.S.
- Died: June 17, 2019 (aged 71); Los Angeles, California, U.S.
- Education: California College of the Arts; Brooks Institute; University of Southern California
- Occupation: Sculptor

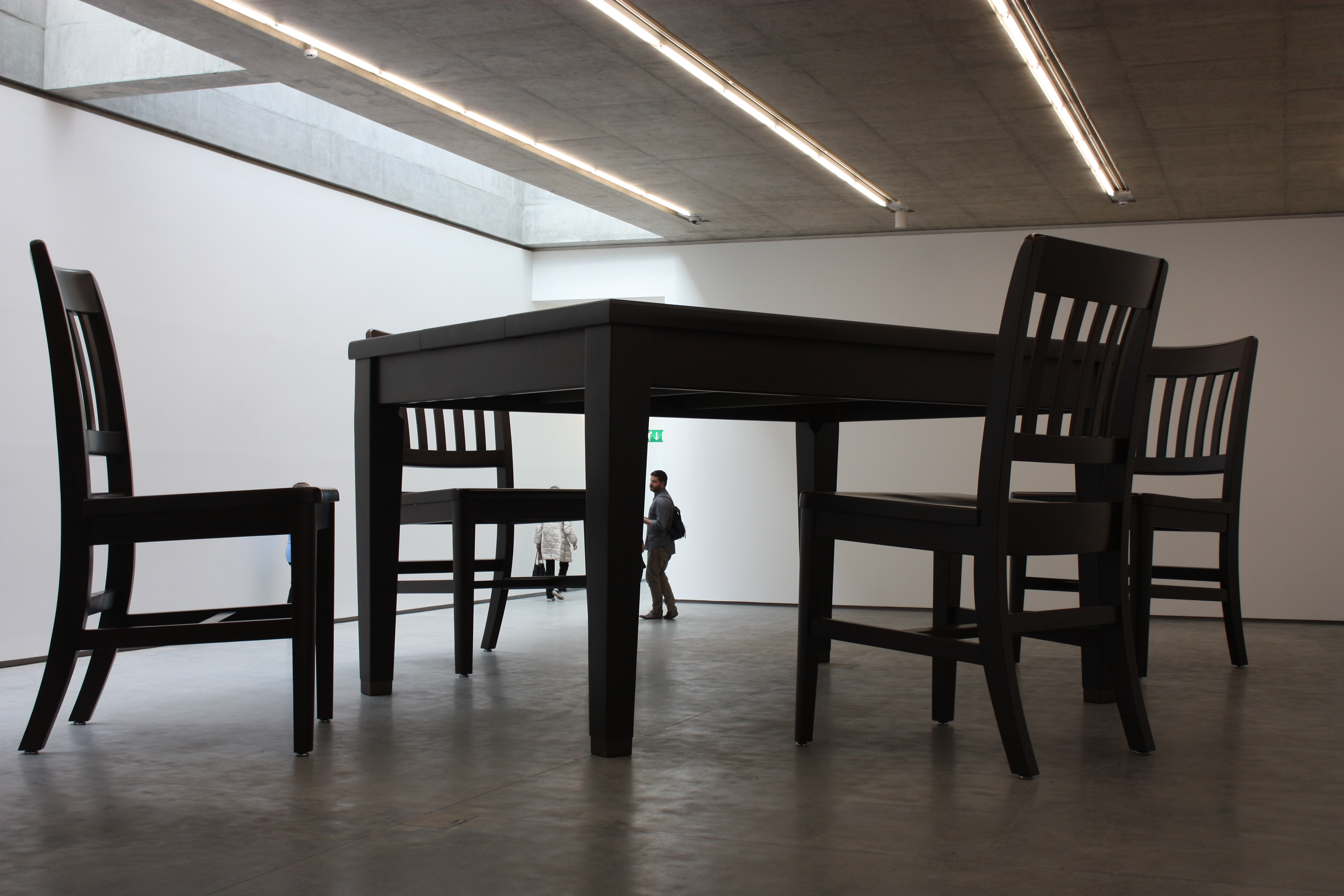
Robert Therrien, No title (table and four chairs), 2003, on display at The Metropolitan Arts Centre, Belfast in 2012

Robert Therrien (November 17, 1947 – June 17, 2019) was an American artist known for his large-scale sculptures. His work reimagined and reinvented objects from everyday life, such as a set of table and chairs or stacks of plates, turning them into monumental immersive sculptures. Los Angeles–based, Therrien was described as being possessed by a sense of wonder over commonplace experiences

== Early life ==
Therrien was born in 1947 in Chicago, Illinois. He moved to the San Francisco Bay Area with his family when he was around five years old. After high school, he began his formal art education in Oakland at the California College of the Arts but then moved to Southern California. In 1970, he enrolled at Brooks Institute in Santa Barbara where he received a degree in photography while also studying painting at the affiliated Santa Barbara Art Institute. He went on to earn a Master of Fine Arts from the University of Southern California, Los Angeles.

== Career ==
Therrien began exhibiting in galleries in Los Angeles and New York in 1975. His first major solo museum exhibition was at Los Angeles's then-brand new Museum of Contemporary Art in 1984.

In 1991, the Museo Nacional Centro de Arte Reina Sofía presented a major survey of his work. The works during this time were described as poetically reductive sculptures and paintings of simple but evocative shapes like snowmen, keyholes and chapels. The artist has said he has always been interested in "subjects with fables attached." The objects he chose to recreate not only had to be beautiful to his eyes but they had to have a "universal" shape that is recognizable to everyone.

Therrien's work underwent a shift in emphasis in the early 1990s, his sculptures becoming larger in scale and more clearly representational. He moved from making modestly sized handmade objects to industrially fabricated, large-scale immersive works. Around this time the artist said that "...as (my work) becomes less and less abstract in appearance—its shape more obviously derived from common objects—it also gets more thickly surrounded by abstractions, in the sense of associations or ideas it may refer to."

The artist's solo exhibition at the Los Angeles County Museum of Art in 2000 examined the work at what proved to be a crucial moment in his career. The show featured monumental new sculptures, including Under the Table, 1994, No title (blue plastic plates), 1999, and three gigantic beards. "Therrien's recent work is at once playful and dark," critic Christopher Knight proclaimed in his review of the LACMA show. "Therrien has been making exquisitely crafted sculptures that are easily recognized as objects encountered in the daily world. Yet, however recognizable the object, the sense of estrangement in these new sculptures is more pronounced than ever before."

Therrien died on June 17, 2019, at the age of 71.

== Selected Museum Exhibitions ==
- Public Art Fund, New York, Robert Therrien: Table and Six Chairs, 2005
- Museum of Contemporary Art San Diego, California, Robert Therrien, 2007
- Kunstmuseum Basel, Switzerland, Robert Therrien: Works on Paper, 2008
- Tate Modern, London, ARTIST ROOMS: Robert Therrien, 2009-2010
- De Pont museum, Tilburg, Netherlands, Robert Therrien: Sculptures and drawings, 2011
- The MAC (Metropolitan Arts Centre), Belfast, Northern Ireland, Robert Therrien: No title (table and four chairs), 2012
- The Contemporary Austin, Texas, Robert Therrien, 2015
- Denver Art Museum, Colorado, Robert Therrien: The Power of the Image, 2016
- Parasol unit, London, Robert Therrien: Works 1975-1995, 2016
- Tate Modern, London, ARTIST ROOMS: Robert Therrien, 2018
- The Broad, Los Angeles, Robert Therrien: This is a Story, 2025-2026

== Collections ==
His artwork is included in museum collections worldwide, including:

- the Los Angeles County Museum of Art,
- The Broad,
- the Museum of Modern Art, New York,
- the Tate Modern, London,
- the Stedelijk Museum voor Actuele Kunst, Ghent, Belgium,
- the Kunstmuseum Basel in Switzerland, and
- the Centre Pompidou in Paris.

== Art market ==
Therrien was represented Leo Castelli in New York and Konrad Fischer in Düsseldorf throughout the 1980s and 90s, during which time his work received increasing international recognition. He was represented by Gagosian Gallery at the time of his death. The artist's estate has been represented by David Zwirner Gallery since 2026.
