= Callum Innes =

Scottish abstract painter (born 1962)

Callum Innes (born 1962) is a Scottish abstract painter, a former Turner Prize nominee and winner of the Jerwood Painting Prize. He lives and works in Edinburgh, Scotland.

== Early life and education ==
Callum Innes was born in Edinburgh. He studied at Gray's School of Art (1980–84) and graduated from Edinburgh College of Art in 1985.

== Career ==
Innes began exhibiting in the mid-to-late 1980s and in 1992 had two major exhibitions in public galleries, at the ICA, London, and the Scottish National Gallery of Modern Art, Edinburgh. Since then he has had numerous solo exhibitions throughout Britain, Europe, North America, New Zealand and Asia.

=== Solo exhibitions ===
Innes' first major London exhibition was hosted in 1990 at Frith Street Gallery, London who continue to represent him. A substantial selection of his best-known series, the "Exposed" paintings, was exhibited in 1998 at the Ikon Gallery, Birmingham, England, and at the Kunsthalle Bern the following year. "From Memory", a major exhibition of Callum Innes' work over the past 15 years, was shown at The Fruitmarket Gallery, Edinburgh in 2006, and toured to Modern Art Oxford, and the Museum of Contemporary Art, Sydney.Innes had a substantial solo exhibition of new work at Ingleby Gallery for the Edinburgh Art Festival (2009). "At One Remove", featured at Sean Kelly Gallery New York (2010), as did an exhibition entitled water|colour, featuring 101 of the artist's watercolours paired with text by Irish writer Colm Tóibín. Callum Innes held his first major solo exhibition in Asia at Edouard Malingue Gallery in Hong Kong in 2012.

His most recent solo exhibitions include Callum Innes: Keeping Time, Frith Street Gallery, London (2019), In Position, Château La Coste, Le Puy-Sainte-Réparade, France (2018), Watercolours, Galerie Tschudi (2013–14), Liminal, Sean Kelly Gallery, New York (2013), Whitworth Gallery, Manchester (2013) and i8 Gallery, Reykjavik, Iceland (2013). "I'll Close my Eyes", a major retrospective of Innes' work, was shown at De Pont Museum of Contemporary Art, Tilburg, Netherlands in 2016.

=== Group exhibitions ===
Callum Innes has participated in many group shows, including The British Art Show 3 (1990), Wonderful Life, Lisson Gallery, London (1993), From Here, Karsten Schubert Gallery and Waddington Galleries (1994), Abstractions Provisoires, Musee d'Art Moderne de St Etienne (1997), the touring exhibition About Vision – New British Paintings in the 1990s (1996-7) and Abstract Painting Once Removed at the Contemporary Arts Museum Houston. The last decade has seen Innes continue to participate in international group exhibitions including "Six Degrees of Separation" Jensen Gallery, Auckland, New Zealand (2001), "Singular Forms (Sometimes Repeated): Art from 1951 to the Present", Solomon R. Guggenheim Museum, New York (2004), "Three: 3 Artists in solo displays", Irish Museum of Modern Art, Dublin, Ireland (2007), "Sometimes Making Something Leads to Nothing", Ingleby Gallery, Edinburgh (2009), "What you see is where you're at", Scottish National Gallery of Modern Art, Edinburgh (2010), "Heaviness and Grace", Villa Medici, Rome, Italy (2010). Recent group exhibitions include, Actions. The image of the world can be different, Kettle’s Yard, Cambridge (2018). Abstract Painting Now!, Kunsthalle Krems, Krems, Austria (2017),Silver, Frith Street Gallery, London (2014), GENERATION: 25 Years of Contemporary Art in Scotland, Scottish National Gallery, Edinburgh (2014) and Watercolour, Tate Britain (2011), among others.

== Collections ==
Innes' work is represented in numerous collections, both private and public including the Scottish National Gallery of Modern Art, The Fort Worth Museum of Modern Art, The Irish Museum of Modern Art, The Tate London, The San Francisco Museum of Modern Art, The National Gallery of Australia, Canberra, Guggenheim Museum, Deutsche Bank, De Pont Museum of Contemporary Art, Centre Pompidou, Museu d’Art Contemporani de Barcelona and Arts Council Collection, UK, British Museum, London, IMMA, Dublin, Whitworth Art Gallery, Manchester and Philadelphia Museum of Art, among others.

== Recognition ==
In 1995 he was shortlisted for the Turner Prize which was won by Damien Hirst. In 1998 Innes won the NatWest Art Prize and in 2002 he won the Jerwood Painting Prize and the Artisti Invitati Al Premio Internazionale.

== Publications ==
- de Chassey, Eric (2018),Callum Innes: In Position, Château La Coste, Le Puy Ste Réparade.
- Ed. Innes, Callum, text(s) by Fiona Bradley, Briony Fer, Colm Tóibín et al. (2016) Callum Innes: I’ll Close My Eyes, Germany: Hatje Cantz Verlag, ISBN 978-3-7757-4245-0
- Tóibín, Colm (2016) Callum Innes: Edges, Spain / UK / Switzerland: Callum Innes & Ivorypress ISBN 978-84-942820-3-4
- Innes, Callum and Colm Tóibín (2011) water | colour, New York: Sean Kelly Galery ISBN 9780966215830
- Ed. Bradley, Fiona, text(s) by Michael Auping, Fiona Bradley, Eric de Chassey et al. (2006) Callum Innes: From Memory, Germany: Hatje Cantz ISBN 978-3-7757-1850-9
