= David Claerbout =

Belgian artist

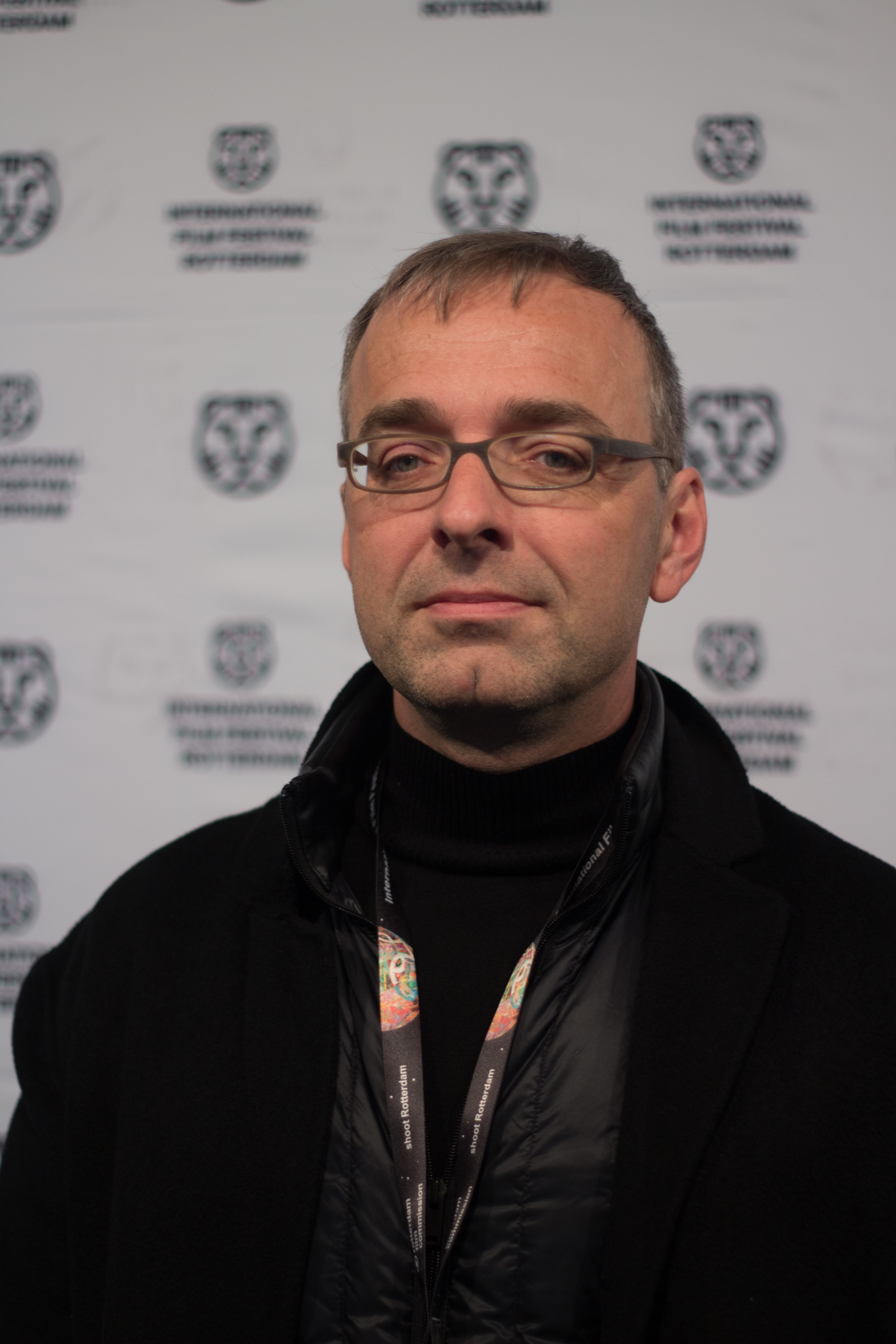
David Claerbout, 2017

David Claerbout (born 1969, Kortrijk, Belgium) is a Belgian artist. His work combines elements of still photography and the moving image.

== Early life and education ==
Claerbout studied at Nationaal Hoger Instituut voor Schone Kunsten, Antwerp from 1992-1995. He trained as a painter, but became more and more interested in time through investigations in the nature of photography, the still and the moving image (Bergson's duree echoed in Gilles Deleuze Cinema 1 and Cinema 2).

== Work ==
David Claerbout is "best known for large-scale moving and still imagery that deals with the passage of time".

In early works, such as Kindergarten Antonio Sant’Elia 1932 made in 1998 and the last in a series, he presents an old, black and white photograph as a large, mute projection.

In Vietnam, 1967, near Duc Pho (Reconstruction after Hiromishi Mine) (2001) time is suspended as an airplane caught by the camera moments before its crash, floats, the sunlight gently moving over a green and hilly landscape. In the book Visible Time, David Green writes:

“What one actually experiences or indeed what one sees in this work, is not the conflation of photography and film but, a conjuncture of the two mediums in which neither ever loses its specificity. We are thus faced with a phenomenon in which two different mediums co-exist and seem to simultaneously occupy the same object. The projection screen here provides a point of intersection for both the photographic and filmic image.”

With works such as Villa Corthout (2001) and Piano Player (2002), Claerbout’s work moves towards forms of narratives to describe ‘moments in time’ within the moving image, taking a more cinematic dimension.

In the Bordeaux Piece (2004) actors repeat a given dialogue and a set of given movements, deconstructing cinematic time. It centers on a conversation between a couple that is repeated over and over in different parts of a 1996 Bordeaux house designed by the architect Rem Koolhaas. The piece is in fact a 14 hours film made out of 70 shorter films shot at 10 minutes intervals throughout the day. The narrative slowly collapses, giving way to the movement of the sun over the landscape, architecture and people, thus creating a different temporality. One protagonist is played by Josse De Pauw, who helped Claerbout write the script.

In Sections of a Happy Moment (2007), Claerbout seems to ‘dissect’ a moment in the life of a Chinese family in the courtyard of a nondescript estate. A group of people are gathered around a ball suspended mid-air, all the faces turned towards it, smiling happily. Over the course of 25 minutes, this moment in time is analyzed from a multitude of different angles and perspectives, allowing the viewer an omnipresence that is paradoxical. The fragmentation of time in this piece, through freeze – frames of the same moment, creates 'visible duration'.

In Sunrise (2009), Claerbout presents an 18-minute work in near-darkness, accentuating the dim tones by projecting the film on to a grey surface. For nearly the entire film, a housemaid goes about her chores in the muted light of pre-dawn, finally departing the house and cycling through a dimly-lit landscape, accompanied by Sergei Rachmaninoff's Vocalise (1912).

Set on the coastline of Brittany, France, The Quiet Shore (2011) is a 36-minute black-and-white film capturing scenes that range from moments of minute detail to panoramic expanses of coastal landscape. The viewer experiences, frame by frame, a single moment from a multitude of different perspectives and viewpoints.

== Exhibitions ==
Claerbout participated in the DAAD Berlin Artist Program in 2002–2003. In 2007, he showed five works at the Centre Pompidou in Paris; the exhibition later toured to the List Visual Arts Center in Cambridge, Massachusetts, to the Kunstmuseum St. Gallen in St. Gallen, Switzerland, to the Morris and Helen Belkin Art Gallery in Vancouver, to the De Pont Museum of Contemporary Art in Tilburg, Holland, and to the Metropolitan Museum of Photography in Tokyo. Other solo exhibitions include ‘Diese Sonne strahlt immer’, Vienna Secession (2012); ‘David Claerbout: Architecture of Narrative’, San Francisco Museum of Modern Art (2011); ‘The Time That Remains’, WIELS Contemporary Art Centre, Brussels (2011); and ‘uncertain eye’, Pinakothek der Moderne, Munich (2010).

=== Selected solo exhibitions ===
- 2002 Kunstverein Hannover, Hanover
- 2004 Kunstbau im Lehnbachhaus, Munich
- 2005 Akademie der Künste, 'Background Time – Gezeiten', Berlin
- 2005 VanAbbemuseum, Eindhoven
- 2007 Centre Georges Pompidou, 'David Claerbout', Paris
- 2008 MIT LIST Visual Arts Center, Cambridge MA
- 2008 Kunstmuseum St. Gallen, 'After the Quiet', St. Gallen/Switzerland
- 2008 Belkin Galleries at The University of British Columbia, Vancouver
- 2008 National Museum of Contemporary Art, Athens
- 2009 De Pont Museum of Contemporary Art, 'The Shape of Time', Tilburg
- 2010 Pinakothek der Moderne, Munich, Germany
- 2011 Wiels, 'Le temps qui reste', Brussels
- 2011 SF MOMA, San Francisco
- 2012 MART Museo di arte moderna e contemporanea di Trento e Rovereto
- 2012 Parasol Unit, ‘the time that remains’, London, England
- 2012 Secession, ‘Diese Sonne strahlt immer’, Vienna, Austria
- 2013 Kunsthalle Mainz, Germany
- 2014 Nederlands Fotomuseum, Rotterdam
- 2015 MAMCO, Geneva
- 2016 Städel Museum, Frankfurt, Germany
- 2017 KINDL, Berlin, Germany
- 2017 Schaulager, Basel, Switzerland
- 2018 The pure necessity: Rüdiger Schöttle Gallery, Munich
- 2022 The Close: Rüdiger Schöttle Gallery, Munich

== Literature ==
Selected Monographs/ Exhibition Catalogues

2002

- Kunstverein Hannover (ed.), David Claerbout, Brussels: A Prior, 2002 (exh.cat.)

2003

- CGAC Centro Galego de Arte Contemporánea (ed.), David Claerbout [texts by Stephan Berg, Rachel Kushner], Santiago de Compostela, 2003 (exh.cat.)

2004

- Gaensheimer, Susanne, Meschede, Friedrich et al. (ed.), David Claerbout, Köln: Verlag der Buchhandlung Walther König, 2004 (exh.cat.)
- Green, David, Lowry, Joanna, Visible Time: The work of David Claerbout, Herbert Read Gallery, Brighton: Photoworks, 2004 (exh.cat.)

2008

- Van Assche, Christine (ed.), The Shape of Time, Zürich: JRP Ringier/Centre Pompidou/MIT List Center of Visual Arts/De Pont Foundation/Kunstmuseum St. Gallen/Morris and Helen Belkin Art Gallery, 2008 (exh.cat.)
- National Museum of Contemporary Art (ed.), David Claerbout, Athens, 2008 (exh.cat.)

2012

- Ardalan, Ziba, Hoelzl, Ingrid, Snauwaert, Dirk, David Claerbout. the time that remains, Ludion, 2012
- Pacher, Jeanette/Secession (ed.), Diese Sonne strahlt immer, Vienna: Secession, Vereinigung bildender KünstlerInnen, 2012 (exh.cat.)

2015

- McMonagle, Christine/Sean Kelly Gallery (eds.), David Claerbout. Drawings and studies. With an essay by Christian Viveros-Fauné, Hatje Cantz Verlag/Sean Kelly Gallery, 2015
- Davila, Thierry, Shadow Pieces. David Claerbout, mamco: Geneva, 2015 (exh.cat.)
- Vergne, Jean-Charles, David Claerbout, Clermont-Ferrand: FRAC Auvergne, 2015 (exh.cat.)

== Recognition ==
Claerbout has been awarded the Prize of the Günther-Peill-Stiftung (2010).

== List of selected works ==
- Boom (1996)

Single Channel Video Installation, Colour, Silent, 18’44”

- Ruurlo, Bocurloscheweg 1910 (1997)

Single Channel Video Installation, Black and White, Silent, 10’

- Kindergarten Antonio Sant’Elia, 1932 (1998)

Single Channel Video Installation, Black and White, Silent, 10’

- Untitled (Carl and Julia) (2000)

Interactive Video Installation, Black and White, Silent

- Venice Light Boxes (2000)

4 Light boxes, Cibachrome, Black and White

- Vietnam, 1967, near Duc Pho (Reconstruction after Hiroshimi Mine) (2001)

Video Installation, Colour, Silent, 3’30”

- Villa Corthout (2001)

5 - Channel Video Installation, Black and White, Mono Sound, 25’

- The Stack (2002)

Video Installation, Colour, Silent, 36’

- Piano Player (2002)

Single Channel Video Installation, Colour, Dolby Surround Sound, 7’

- Rocking Chair (2003)

Double Screen Interactive Video Installation, Black and White, Silent

- Bordeaux Piece (2004)

Single Channel Video Installation, Colour, Dual Mono Sound, 13:43’

- Shadow Piece (2005)

Single Channel Video Installation, Black and White, Stereo Sound, 30’19”

- Sections of a Happy Moment (2007)

Single Channel Video Installation, Black and White, Stereo Sound (Random Muzac), 25’57”
