= Benthem Crouwel Architekten =

Dutch architectural firm

Benthem Crouwel Architects is a Dutch architectural firm founded in 1979 by Jan Benthem and Mels Crouwel. Today, partners Pascal Cornips, Daniel Jongtien, Saartje van der Made and Joost Vos lead an international team of 60 professionals at the Amsterdam based Benthem Crouwel LAB. They work on projects from Amsterdam, Paris and California.

== History ==
The founding partners Jan Benthem and Mels Crouwel met in 1979 at the Delft University of Technology, where one of the professors introduced them because he thought they would make a good team. They started their firm Benthem Crouwel Architects the same year, from a small basement in an Amsterdam canal house.

A key project in the early period was the home of Jan Benthem himself, De Fantasie in Almere (1982-1984). The house shows the pragmatic approach combined with the spatial and technical innovation that is typical for the office. At that time they also got a series of assignments for customs emplacements on the border of The Netherlands with Belgium and Germany.

After several assignments at Amsterdam Schiphol Airport, such as a bicycle parking, Benthem Crouwel became the master architect Schiphol in 1986, in cooperation with NACO (Netherlands Airport Consultants). Since 1989 Benthem Crouwel is the supervisory architect of the international exhibition and conference centre of The Netherlands, Amsterdam RAI.

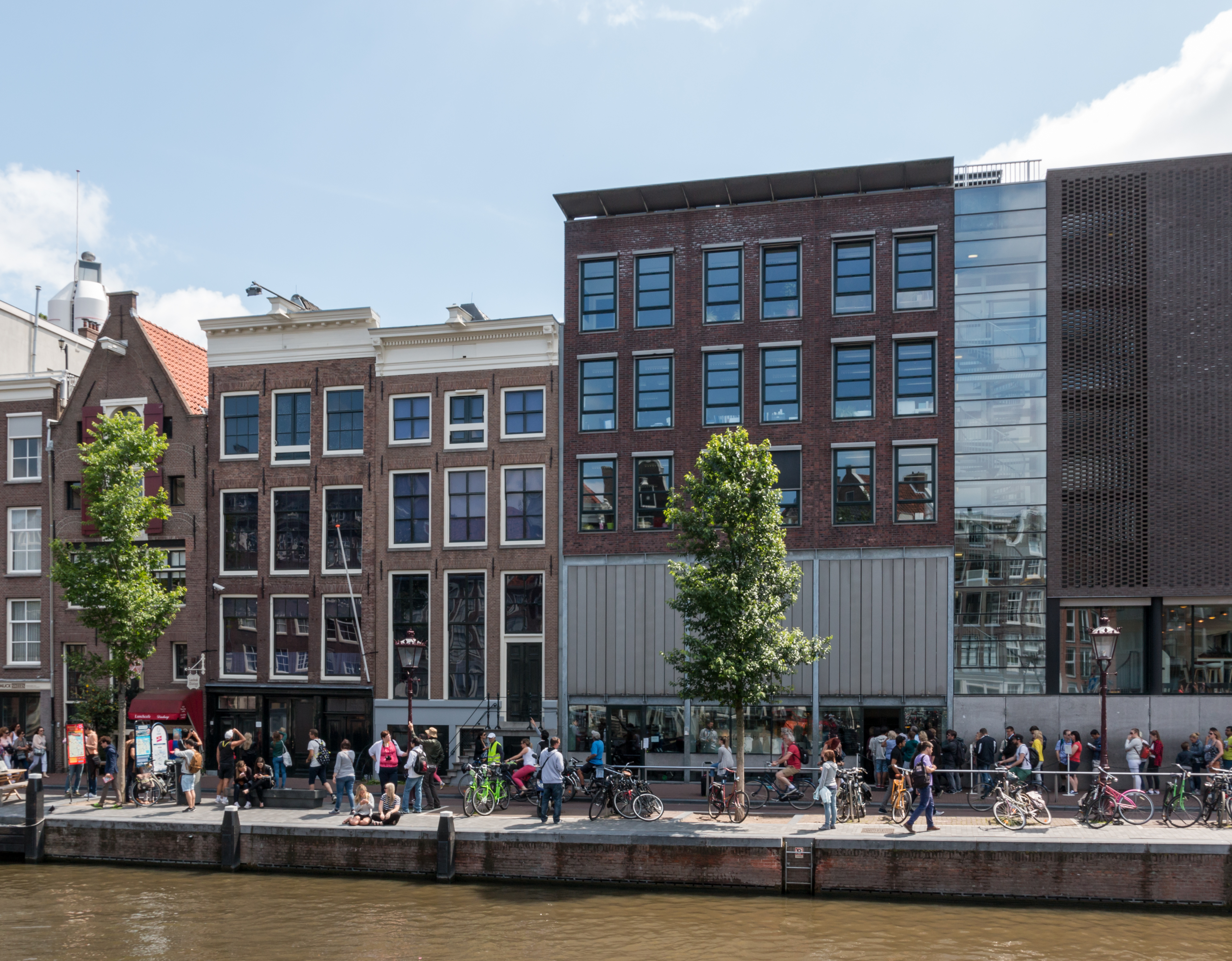
Amsterdam (NL), Anne-Frank-Huis -- 2015 -- 7185

Benthem Crouwel has designed museums, public buildings and transit. Some examples are the Anne Frank House (1999)and Ziggo Dome (2012) in Amsterdam, De Pont museum for contemporary art, Tilburg (1993), restoration and expansion of Las Palmas, Rotterdam (2008), Stedelijk Museum Amsterdam (2012), Datacenter AM4 (2017) and two office buildings for the Dutch Charity Lotteries (2018) and ING (2020).

The office is also involved in infrastructural projects. One of the newest projects are the North/South Line (Amsterdam Metro) and the renewal of all major Dutch transportation hubs; Amsterdam Central station, Utrecht Central station, Rotterdam Central station and The Hague Central station. And bridges, such as Muiderbrug, A1 Amsterdam – Rijnkanaal (2010) and the High Speed Train longest bridge at Hollandsch Diep (2006).

Mels Crouwel was Chief Government Architect from 2004 till 2008.

In 2021, the company won the contract for the design of the new Brno railway station, the Czech Republic.

== Selection of completed projects ==
- 1984 House Benthem, Almere, NL
- 1993 Museum De Pont, Tilburg, NL
- 1993 Terminal West, Amsterdam Airport Schiphol, NL
- 1995 Schiphol Plaza, Amsterdam Airport Schiphol, NL
- 1995 Station Schiphol, Amsterdam Airport Schiphol, NL
- 1996 Malietower, Den Haag, NL
- 1998 Station building, Lelystad Airport, NL
- 1998 Pop venue 013, Tilburg, NL
- 1999 Anne Frank House, Amsterdam, NL
- 2001 Villa ArenA, Amsterdam, NL
- 2002 Photo museum FOAM, Amsterdam, NL
- 2002 GEM, Museum of Contemporary Art, Den Haag, NL
- 2004 Gerrit Rietveld Academie, Amsterdam, NL
- 2006 Bridge High Speed Train, Hollandsch Diep, NL
- 2008 Penthouse Las Palmas, Rotterdam, NL
- 2009 Etrium, Köln, D
- 2009 Elicium, Amsterdam RAI, NL
- 2009 Deutsches Bergbau-Museum, Bochum, D
- 2009 Muiderbridge, Amsterdam-Rijnkanaal, NL
- 2009 Metropool, Hengelo, NL
- 2010 ACTA, Academisch Centrum voor Tandheelkunde Amsterdam, NL
- 2011 Amsterdam Museum, Amsterdam, NL
- 2012 Ziggo Dome, Amsterdam, NL
- 2012 Stedelijk Museum, Amsterdam, Netherlands
- 2015 Expansion Museum De Pont, NL
- 2013 Fletcher hotel, Amsterdam, NL
- 2014 Grotius building, Radboud University Nijmegen, NL
- 2014 Rotterdam Central Station, NL
- 2015 The Hague Central Station, NL
- 2015 Paleisbrug, Den Bosch, NL
- 2016 Utrecht Central Station, NL
- 2017 AM4 Datacenter, Amsterdam, NL
- 2017 Railway district Delft, NL
- 2018 North/South metro line, Amsterdam, NL
- 2018 Dutch Charity Lotteries Office, Amsterdam, NL
- 2018 Amsterdam Central Station, NL
- 2019 Expension Rai hal 5, NL
- 2020 ING Office, Amsterdam, NL

== Selection of current projects ==
- Brno Main Station, CZ
- HLRS III University of Stuttgart, GE
- Metro Ligne 18, Paris, FR
- Metro Station Ligne 17, Paris, FR
- Afsluitdijk, NL
- Florian, Bratislava
- Residence Nádraží Žižkov, Prague, CZ
- 4th Quadrant Victory Square, Prague, CZ
- Palazzo, 'S Hertogenbosch, NL
- Schiphol Airport, Amsterdam, NL
- MIRT-verkenning Leiden (Meerjarenprogramma Infrastructuur Ruimte en Transport), NL

== Selection of awards ==
- 1989 Berliner Kunstpreis in the category architecture
- 1999 BNA Kubus for the contribution to the infrastructural architecture in The Netherlands
- 2009 Deutsche Gütesiegel in gold for sustainable building for office building; the Etrium
