= Serious Organised Crime and Police Act 2005 =

Act of the Parliament of the United Kingdom

Serious Organised Crime and Police Act 2005 (Note: Section 179(1).)
- Act of Parliament
- Parliament of the United Kingdom
- Long title: Long title An Act to provide for the establishment and functions of the Serious Organised Crime Agency; to make provision about investigations, prosecutions, offenders and witnesses in criminal proceedings and the protection of persons involved in investigations or proceedings; to provide for the implementation of certain international obligations relating to criminal matters; to amend the Proceeds of Crime Act 2002; to make further provision for combatting crime and disorder, including new provision about powers of arrest and search warrants and about parental compensation orders; to make further provision about the police and policing and persons supporting the police; to make provision for protecting certain organisations from interference with their activities; to make provision about criminal records; to provide for the Private Security Industry Act 2001 to extend to Scotland; and for connected purposes.
- Citation: 2005 c. 15
- Introduced by: David Blunkett, Home Secretary (Commons)
- Territorial extent: England and Wales; Scotland (in part); Northern Ireland (in part); (Note: Section 179(2)–(10).)

Dates
- Royal assent: 7 April 2005
- Commencement: Various (Note: Section 178.)
- Repealed: 30 March 2012 (sections 132–138); 7 October 2013 (Part 1); 3 May 2015 – 1 March 2016 (Part 2, chapter 3)
Other legislation
Amends	Unlawful Drilling Act 1819; Criminal Law Act 1826; Railways Clauses Consolidation Act 1845; Licensing Act 1872; Explosives Act 1875; Public Order Act 1936; Street Offences Act 1959; Criminal Law Act 1967; Port of London Act 1968; Immigration Act 1971; Solicitors Act 1974; House of Commons Disqualification Act 1975; Police Pensions Act 1976; Criminal Law Act 1977; Judicature (Northern Ireland) Act 1978; Theft Act 1978; Customs and Excise Management Act 1979; Magistrates' Courts Act 1980; Law Reform (Miscellaneous Provisions) (Scotland) Act 1980; Limitation Act 1980; Aviation Security Act 1982; Sporting Events (Control of Alcohol etc.) Act 1985; Criminal Justice Act 1988; Road Traffic (Consequential Provisions) Act 1988; Official Secrets Act 1989; Security Service Act 1989; Football (Offences) Act 1991; Deer Act 1991; Drug Trafficking Act 1994; Criminal Procedure (Consequential Provisions) (Scotland) Act 1995; Police Act 1996; Confiscation of Alcohol (Young Persons) Act 1997; Terrorism Act 2000; Football (Disorder) Act 2000; Health and Social Care Act 2001; International Criminal Court Act 2001; Anti-terrorism, Crime and Security Act 2001; Scottish Public Services Ombudsman Act 2002; Crime (International Co-operation) Act 2003; Asylum and Immigration (Treatment of Claimants, etc.) Act 2004; Domestic Violence, Crime and Victims Act 2004; Hunting Act 2004
Repeals/revokes	Public Order (Amendment) Act 1996
Amended by	Armed Forces Act 2006; Safeguarding Vulnerable Groups Act 2006; Police and Justice Act 2006; Police, Public Order and Criminal Justice (Scotland) Act 2006; Northern Ireland (Miscellaneous Provisions) Act 2006; Terrorism Act 2006; Wireless Telegraphy Act 2006; Legal Services Act 2007; Serious Crime Act 2007; Coroners and Justice Act 2009; Policing and Crime Act 2009; Bribery Act 2010; Criminal Justice and Licensing (Scotland) Act 2010; Charities Act 2011; Financial Services Act 2012; Protection of Freedoms Act 2012; Anti-Social Behaviour, Crime and Policing Act 2014; Deregulation Act 2015; Criminal Justice (Scotland) Act 2016; Criminal Finances Act 2017; Policing and Crime Act 2017; Sanctions and Anti-Money Laundering Act 2018; Sentencing Act 2020; Economic Crime and Corporate Transparency Act 2023; Digital Markets, Competition and Consumers Act 2024; Employment Rights Act 2025
Repealed by	Police Reform and Social Responsibility Act 2011 (clauses 132–138); Crime and Courts Act 2013 (Part 1); Serious Crime Act 2015 (Part 2, chapter 3)

Status: Partially repealed

Text of statute as originally enacted

Revised text of statute as amended

The Serious Organised Crime and Police Act 2005 (c. 15) (often abbreviated to SOCPA or SOCAP) is an act of the Parliament of the United Kingdom aimed primarily at creating the Serious Organised Crime Agency. It also significantly extended and simplified the powers of arrest of a constable and introduced restrictions on protests in the vicinity of the Palace of Westminster. It was introduced into the House of Commons on 24 November 2004 and was passed by Parliament and given royal assent on 7 April 2005.

Measures to introduce a specific offence of "incitement to religious hatred" were included in early drafts of the act, but then dropped so the bill would pass before the 2005 general election. The offence has since been created by the Racial and Religious Hatred Act 2006.

== Extent of application ==
The act applies principally to England and Wales but s.179 permits the extent or designates sections applying only to Scotland and/or Northern Ireland; additionally s.179(9) extends the application of four sections (ss.172, 173, 177, 178) beyond the United Kingdom to the Channel Islands and the Isle of Man.

== Changes to powers of arrest (England and Wales) ==
The act introduced changes to the powers of arrest utilised by both "constables" and "other persons" in England and Wales. The term arrestable offence ceased to have effect as, bar a few preserved exemptions, one power of arrest now applies to all offences when the arrest is made by a constable. Where the threshold of an arrestable offence was previously used to enable specific powers of search or powers to delay certain entitlements, these powers are preserved, but the threshold is changed to that of an indictable offence.

Subject to an overriding requirement that an arrest is reasonably required and that no less intrusive way of advancing the investigation is reasonably available (the "Necessity Test"): the constable may arrest without a warrant anyone who is about to or is in the act of committing an offence, or anyone they have reasonable grounds to suspect of committing or being about to commit an offence. They may also arrest anyone they have reasonable grounds to believe is guilty of an offence they suspect has been committed. These powers to arrest only apply if one or more of the following reasons apply:

1. To enable the name of the person in question to be ascertained (in the case where the constable does not know, and cannot readily ascertain, the person's name, or has reasonable grounds for doubting whether a name given by the person as his name is his "real name")
2. As reason 1 but in respect of the person's address
3. To prevent the person in question:
  - Causing physical injury to themselves or any other person
  - Suffering physical injury
  - Causing loss of or damage to property
  - Committing an offence against public decency (but only where members of the public going about their normal business cannot reasonably be expected to avoid the person in question)
  - Causing an unlawful obstruction of the highway
4. To protect a child or other vulnerable person from the person being arrested
5. To allow the prompt and effective investigation of the offence or of the conduct of the person being arrested
6. To prevent any prosecution for the offence from being hindered by the disappearance of the person being arrested

Given the scope of the last two provisions, a new Code of Practice was issued for guidance.

These changes were enacted on 1 January 2006.

== Protected sites ==
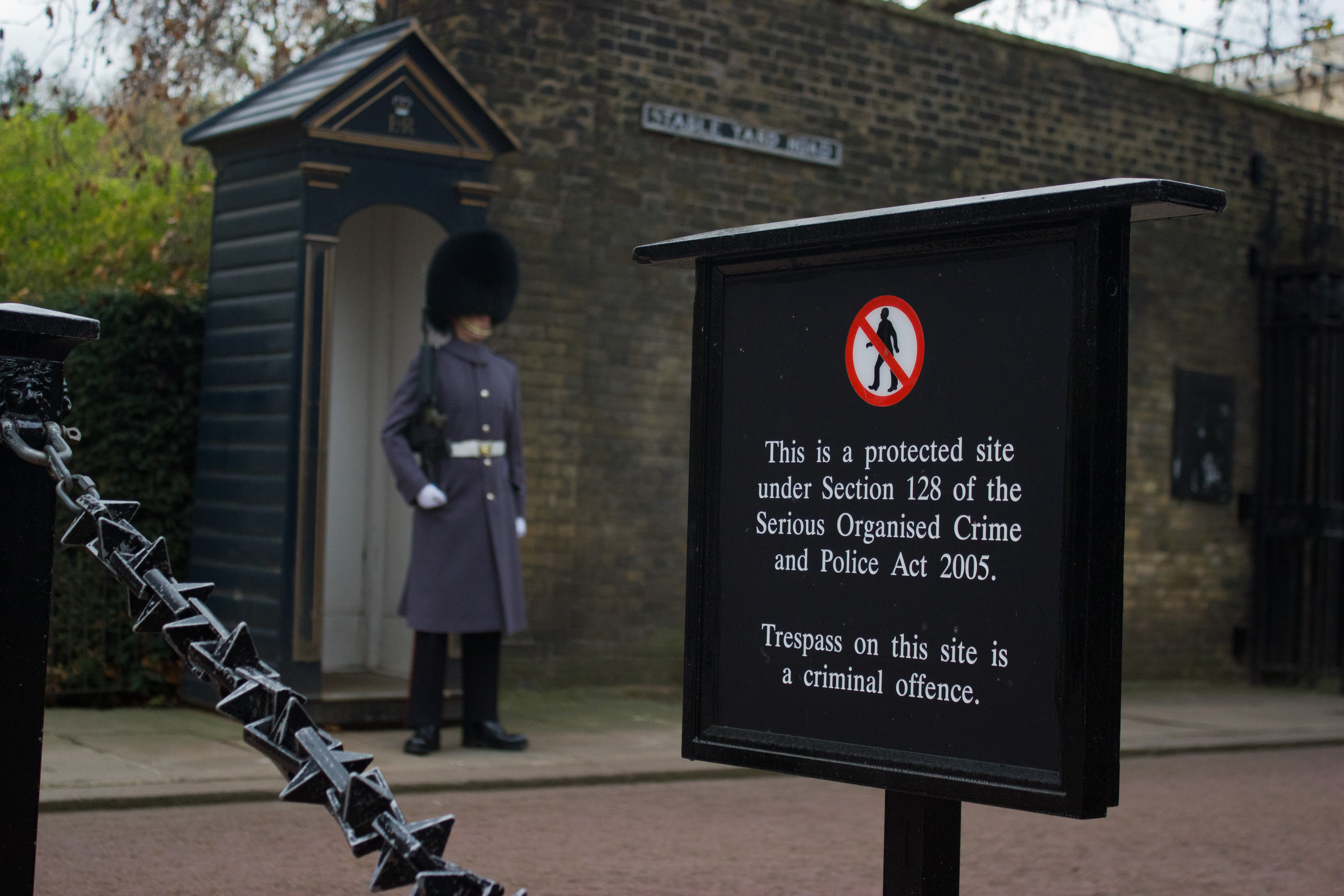
Guard post at St James's Palace, Stable Yard Road, London. The palace is a protected site.

Sections 128–131 criminalise trespass at certain "protected sites", which consist of nuclear sites and additional sites designated by the Secretary of State. The latter consist of a range of royal, parliamentary, and government sites. Trespass is punishable on summary conviction with a fine and/or imprisonment for up to a year.

== Protests near Parliament ==
In addition to the Protected Sites, the act is controversial primarily for sections 132 to 138, which restrict the right to demonstrate within a "designated area" of up to one kilometre from any point in Parliament Square. Demonstrators must give written notice to the Commissioner of the Metropolitan Police six days in advance, or if this is not reasonably practicable then no less than 24 hours in advance.

The area itself is defined by a Statutory Instrument, the Serious Organised Crime and Police Act 2005 (Designated Area) Order 2005, rather than the act. It specifically excludes Trafalgar Square, a traditional site of protest on the northern boundary of the area. Apart from Parliament it also includes Whitehall, Downing Street, Westminster Abbey, the Middlesex Guildhall, New Scotland Yard, and the Home Office. It also covers a small section of land on the other bank of the River Thames, including County Hall, the Jubilee Gardens, St Thomas' Hospital and the London Eye.

These provisions of the act were introduced partially as a result of Brian Haw and his Parliament Square Peace Campaign. Haw was a peace campaigner, who from 1 June 2001 until his death on 18 June 2011 protested against Britain and the United States' policy towards Iraq. He used placards and a loudspeaker to get his message across, which some British MPs found disruptive. Patrick Cormack MP said in a Parliamentary debate on 7 February 2005 that the lives of "members of staff in Portcullis House and 1 Parliament Street, as well as the police who are on duty at Members' entrance day after day ... are made intolerable by those people baying away, without a crowd to address, merely repeating themselves ad nauseam."

However, others, such as Jeremy Corbyn MP disagreed, saying "The Minister should think carefully about removing rights that are enshrined in our history", and Glenda Jackson MP agreed with him, saying "I regard it as the voice of democracy". Lembit Öpik MP drew attention to the comments of the Prime Minister Tony Blair, who, on 7 April 2002, said: "When I pass protestors every day at Downing Street ... I may not like what they call me, but I thank God they can. That's called freedom." The Home Office stated the security concerns, such as the possibility of explosive devices being left in and around Haw's paraphernalia, were another reason for the legislation.

The legislation initially appeared ineffective against Haw. The High Court of Justice ruled that as Haw's protest had begun in June 2001 he was not required to get authorisation. The three-strong judicial panel accepted arguments by Haw's lawyers that the law only applied to demonstrations that took place after it came into force, not those previously in progress. However, on 8 May 2006, this decision was overturned by the Court of Appeal.

On 1 August 2005, the day that the act came into force, the Stop the War Coalition and others organised a protest against the prohibition. They did not officially ask for permission, but at the subsequent court cases it was revealed that the Stop the War Coalition had negotiated with police about the protest. The action attracted some 200 people according to reports – among them Lauren Booth, Tony Blair's sister-in-law – and five people were arrested.

The first conviction under the act was in December 2005, when Maya Evans was convicted for reading the names of British soldiers killed in the Iraq War, near the Cenotaph in October, without police authorisation.

In 2006, the comedian and political activist Mark Thomas attacked this section of the act by organising several protests within the area, within the confines of the law. His most notable was when he organised 21 protests over the course of a single day within the area. This act got Thomas into the Guinness Book of Records for taking part in the most protests in a single day. However, as the first and last protest took place in the same location, only 20 protests are recognised by Guinness.

In January 2007 Tate Britain opened State Britain, an installation by artist Mark Wallinger that recreated the display confiscated by the police from Brian Haw's protest. The Tate press release on the exhibition mentioned that the Serious Organised Crime and Police Act 2005 prohibited "unauthorised demonstrations within a one kilometre radius of Parliament Square" and that this radius passed through the Duveen Hall, literally bisecting Wallinger's exhibit. Wallinger marked this on the floor with a black line running through the Tate. Press reports dwelt on the potential dangers of this infringement, speculating that the police might even remove the half of the exhibit on the "wrong" side of the line. Charles Thomson of the Stuckists art group wrote to The Guardian, pointing out that the exclusion zone ended at Thorney Street, 300 yards before the Tate.

Gordon Brown said that he planned to look again at this section of the SOCPA, meaning that protesters would eventually be able to protest freely in the kilometre-radius of parliament without prior authorisation being needed. In October 2007, the Home Office published a public consultation document, Managing Protest Around Parliament, which "takes another look at sections 132–138 [of SOCPA] and explores whether there is another way to address the situation that would both uphold the right to protest while also giving police the powers they need to keep the peace".

Sections 132 to 138 of the act were repealed by the Police Reform and Social Responsibility Act 2011, which provides for a different scheme of "prohibited activities" on Parliament Square.

== Harassment ==
SOCPA also amended the Protection from Harassment Act 1997 so that "pursuing a course of conduct" amounting to harassment could mean approaching two people just once, rather than one person at least twice, as before. Commentators such as George Monbiot have voiced the concern that the amended Harassment Act effectively "allows the police to ban any campaign they please".

== See also ==
- Riot Act
