= Welcome to Goon Island =

Welcome To Goon Island

Studio album by XX Teens
- Released: 28 July 2008
- Genre: Art punk, post-punk, electropunk, neo-psychedelia, dance-punk
- Label: Mute Records
- Producer: Ross Orton

Professional ratings
Aggregate scores
Source	Rating
Metacritic	60/100
Review scores
Source	Rating
Allmusic	3.5/5 stars
Artrocker	4/5 stars
BBC	(favorable)
ChartAttack	3.5/5 stars
The Independent	(unfavorable)
JustPressPlay	5/10 stars
The Skinny	4/5 stars
This Is Fake DIY	8/10 stars

Welcome To Goon Island is the only studio album by XX Teens, released by Mute Records. It had been set for a mainstream release on 28 July 2008 but was made available from selected independent record shops four weeks before that date. Each of those stores gave away free posters of the album.

The song "Darlin'" was included in "NME's Tracks Of The Year 2007".

== Track listing ==
1. "The Way We Were" - 3:48
2. "B-54" - 3:19
3. "Round" - 3:03
4. "Ba (Ba-Ba Ba)" - 2:56
5. "Onkawara" - 3:26
6. "(Reprise)" - 0:43
7. "Only You" - 2:23
8. "My Favourite Hat" - 4:21
9. "Darlin'" - 4:12
10. "Sun Comes Up" - 4:05
11. "For Brian Haw" - 5:40
12. "How to Reduce the Chances of Being a Terror Victim" - 3:54
