= Mark Wallinger =

British artist (born 1959)

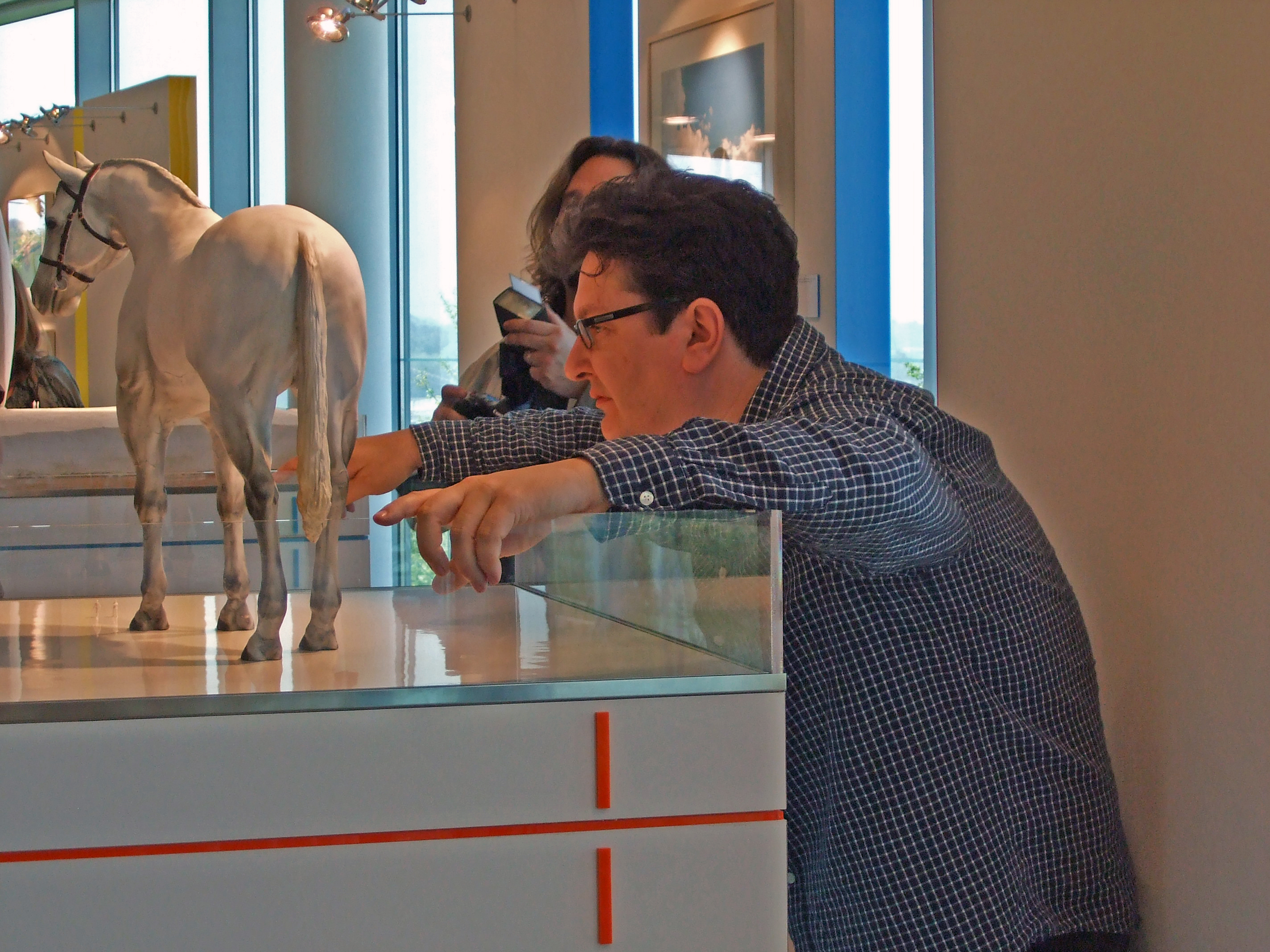
- Wallinger on 10 May 2008
- Born: 25 May 1959 (age 67); Chigwell, UK
- Education: Chelsea School of Art; Goldsmiths, University of London
- Known for: Conceptual art, installation art
- Notable work: State Britain; Ecce Homo; Labyrinth
- Awards: Turner Prize

Mark Wallinger (born 25 May 1959) is an English artist. Having previously been nominated for the Turner Prize in 1995, he won in 2007 for his installation State Britain. His work Ecce Homo (1999–2000) was the first piece to occupy the empty fourth plinth in Trafalgar Square. He represented Britain at the Venice Biennale in 2001. Labyrinth (2013), a permanent commission for Art on the Underground, was created to celebrate 150 years of the London Underground. In 2018, the permanent work Writ in Water was realized for the National Trust to celebrate where Magna Carta was sealed at Runnymede.

== Life and career ==
=== Education and artistic career ===
Wallinger was born in Chigwell, Essex, on 25 May 1959. He trained at the Chelsea School of Art in London, from 1978 to 1981, before studying for an MA from Goldsmiths, University of London from 1983 to 1985. After graduating in 1985, most of his degree show was exhibited by the Anthony Reynolds Gallery, and he continued to teach part-time at Goldsmiths.

=== Awards ===
In 1998, Wallinger won the Henry Moore Fellowship, British School at Rome, an award offered to outstanding scholars and artists with the opportunity to work in Rome for 3 to 12 months. In 2001, Wallinger was honored with the DAAD Artists-in-Berlin Program, one of the world's most respected artist-in-residence programmes for established artists working in the fine arts, film, literature and music. The following year he received an Honorary Fellowship from the London Institute.

In 2003, Wallinger was the recipient of an Honorary Doctorate from the University of Central England in Birmingham, UK. In 2007, he was awarded the Turner Prize. In 2009, Goldsmith College honoured Wallinger for his achievements which reflect the values important to the Goldsmiths community. In the same year Wallinger's design was selected from a three-strong shortlist for the Ebbsfleet Landmark Project Commission. In 2010, he presented Sinema Amnesia in Çanakkale as part of "My City", a project which invited five artists from five European countries to produce installations in different Turkish cities.

As part of the Transported by Design programme of activities, on 15 October 2015, after two months of public voting, Mark Wallinger's Labyrinth work was elected by Londoners as one of the 10 favourite transport design icons.

In 2019, Writ in Water, a major architectural artwork by Mark Wallinger, in collaboration with Studio Octopi, for the National Trust at Runnymede, Surrey, was shortlisted for the Stirling Prize. In the same year, the project won the RIBA South East Award, the RIBA National Award, the Civic Trust Awards Commendation, MacEwen Award Shortlisting and EUMies Award Nomination, and the Marsh Award for Excellence in Public Fountains or Water features by The Public Statues and Sculptures Association in 2021.

== Turner Prize ==
Mark Wallinger was awarded the 2007 Turner Prize for State Britain, a direct meticulous replica and reconstruction of Brian Haw's protest peace camp outside the Houses of Parliament against policies towards Iraq. The installation occupied the entire length of Tate Britain’s Duveen Galleries, consisting of more than 600 banners, flags, teddy bears, peace signs, Haw's tarpaulin shelter, and other materials amassed by Haw over his years of protest. The original display consisted of donations from the public, including paintings, banners and toys. This had been confiscated by the police under the Serious Organised Crime and Police Act 2005. He also put a black line on the floor of the Tate and through the middle of his exhibit to mark part of a 1 kilometre exclusion zone from Parliament Square. The jury applauded the work for its "immediacy, visceral intensity and historic importance" integrating "a bold political statement with art's ability to articulate fundamental human truths". The art historian Yve-Alain Bois described State Britain as "one of the most remarkable political works of art ever".

On speaking to the BBC about the award, Wallinger added, "I am indebted to all those people who contributed to the making of State Britain. Brian Haw is a remarkable man who has waged a tireless campaign against the folly and hubris of our government's foreign policy. For six-and-a-half years he has remained steadfast in Parliament Square, the last dissenting voice in Britain. Bring home the troops, give us back our rights, trust the people."

In 2011 the artwork was exhibited for the first time in the Netherlands at the De Pont Museum of Contemporary Art.

== Venice Biennale ==
In 2001, the British Council revealed that they had selected Mark Wallinger to produce a solo show of new and past artworks for the British Pavilion at the 49th Venice Biennale. The show included sculpture, video, painting, and photography.

Wallinger presented the site-specific work, Facade (2001), which wrapped the front of the British Pavilion with an identical size replica colour photograph of the Pavilion itself printed on vinyl-coated material attached from scaffolding. In front of the pavilion Oxymoron (1996) was flying from a flagpole, a flag with the British Union Jack replaced by green and orange of the Irish flag colours. In addition to Angel (1997), Threshold to the Kingdom (2000), Life Class (2001), Ghost (2001), and Time and Relative Dimensions in Space (2001), the sculpture Ecce Homo (1999-2000), first presented on the Fourth Plinth in Trafalgar Square, in 2000, welcomed visitors into the main gallery.

Ghost (2001) continued with Wallinger's fixation and exploration of British horse racing traditions. It consisted of a negative reproduction image in a lightbox showing the famous 18th-century oil painting, Whistlejacket (c.1762) by George Stubbs, but altered by adding a horn on its head, thus turning it into a unicorn. In contrast, Time and Relative Dimensions in Space (2001) referred to the space-traveling machine from the British show Doctor Who. Recreated especially for the biennale, Wallinger delivered a reflective mirrored replica of the famous police box.

== Later work ==
Wallinger's later work appears to have largely turned away from his earlier preoccupations, instead apparently focusing on religion and death and the influence of William Blake. Angel is a video played in reverse showing the artist walking backwards at the bottom of the down escalator at Angel Underground Station while reciting the opening lines of the Gospel of John in the King James Bible. At the conclusion of the video the music of Zadok the Priest that forms part of the British Coronation ceremony can be heard as Wallinger 'ascends' up the stairs. No Man's Land, a show at the Whitechapel Gallery included several works on these subjects. Threshold to the Kingdom (2000), for example, is a slow motion video of people coming through automatic double doors at international arrivals at an airport. The video is accompanied by a recording of the famous Miserere by Gregorio Allegri. Wallinger has said that the title might be taken as a double meaning: arrival at the United Kingdom, but also at the kingdom of Heaven, with a security guard playing the part of St. Peter.

The largest work in the No Man's Land show was Prometheus. This piece is in two parts – on the outside, in a dark corridor, is a video of Wallinger (or rather his alter-ego, "Blind Faith") sitting in an electric chair and singing Ariel's song from William Shakespeare's The Tempest. From the corridor, automatic double doors give access to a brightly lit room which has an electric chair bolted to one of the walls, giving a top-down "God's-eye view" of it. On two facing walls are large photos of fists with the words "LOVE" and "HATE" written on them, a reference to the preacher played by Robert Mitchum in the 1955 film, The Night of the Hunter, who had similar tattoos on his knuckles. A circular steel loop gives out a continuous buzzing sound.

Ecce Homo was the first work to occupy the empty plinth in Trafalgar Square. This work is a life-sized statue of a Christ figure, naked apart from a loin cloth, and with his hands bound behind his back. He wears a crown of barbed wire. The sculpture was placed at the very front edge of the massive plinth, emphasising its vulnerability and relative smallness. It was quite popular with the public and was later shown at the Venice Biennale in 2001, where Wallinger was Britain's representative.

He was one of the five artists shortlisted for the Ebbsfleet Landmark Project in January 2008, and in February 2009 it was announced that his design had won the competition. Wallinger's design is of a giant white horse modelled on another of his own racehorses, 'Riviera Red', and has been described by his supporters as "an absolutely mesmerising conflation of old England and new, of the semi-mythical, Tolkienesque past and the six-lanes, all-crawling present".

He curated the exhibition "The Russian Linesman: Frontiers, Borders and Thresholds" at the Hayward Gallery in London, which lasted from February to May 2009. In April 2011, it was announced that Mark Wallinger would be one of three artists (along with Chris Ofili and Conrad Shawcross) to collaborate with the Royal Ballet and the National Gallery to create a piece based on works by the Renaissance painter Titian. Titian Metamorphosis, which documented the entire project from conception to finished performances, was published by London-based publisher Art / Books in two editions in January 2013.

In February 2013, it was announced that Wallinger had created Labyrinth a set of 270 enamel plaques of unicursal labyrinth designs, one for every London tube station, to mark the 150th anniversary of the London Underground; each will be numbered according to its position in the route taken by the contestants in the 2009 Guinness World Record Tube Challenge. In October 2014, Art / Books published Labyrinth: A Journey Through London's Underground by Mark Wallinger, a comprehensive photographic book of all 270 labyrinth designs in situ in the Underground stations.

In 2019 Wallinger displayed his sculpture entitled The World Turned Upside Down at the London School of Economics. The artwork attracted controversy for showing the island of Taiwan as a sovereign entity, rather than as part of the People's Republic of China. After dueling protests by students from both the PRC and ROC and reactions by third party observers (which included the President of Taiwan, Taiwanese Ministry of Foreign Affairs and the co-chairs of the British-Taiwanese All-Party Parliamentary Group in the House of Commons) the university decided later that year that it would retain the original design which chromatically displayed the PRC and ROC as different entities but with the addition of an asterisk beside the name of Taiwan and a corresponding placard that clarified the institution's position regarding the controversy.

In October 2019, Wallinger featured in a group show at Tension Fine Art alongside artists Julian Lowe and Stuart Elliot. The show "You Can't Tell By Looking" was curated by Kate Love.
