= XX Teens =

UK musical group

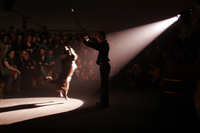

Background information
- Origin: London, England
- Genres: Art punk; post-punk; indie electronic; dance-punk
- Years active: 2004–2008
- Labels: Mute Records, Big Billy Records
- Members: Anthony Silvester; Rich Cash; William Morrow; Rich Nuvo; Sebastian Craig; Jorgen Raa; Sarah Jones; Leo Taylor; Macks Faulkron; Ed Rea Allison

XX Teens were an English five piece post-punk band, originally formed of graduates from the Byam Shaw School of Art in North London. They began performing as Xerox Teens, but with a growing fan base, an eponymous club night, and airplay from Zane Lowe, Marc Riley, Jon Kennedy and Steve Lamacq, the band came to the attention of the Xerox Corporation. After some discussion they decided to change the name to XX Teens.

They made four videos with the Sheffield filmmaker Simon Green, a creative relationship that has continued with Anthony Silvester writing the soundtrack to the 2012 short film Albatross: A Love Story. Videos for their songs were also created by the artist Juliette Blightman and the BBC New Music Shorts competition winner Kirk Hendry.

The band's live shows included contemporary dancers, a uniformed brass section and special guests. Such performances, combined with their distinctive videos and comically recalcitrant radio and press interviews, were hallmarks of the band's early years and gained them a following in the art world. They collaborated with Cerith Wyn Evans to mark Modern Art Oxford's 40th anniversary, were photographed by Hedi Slimane and performed for Martin Creed at Tate Britain. Other notable performances included the Royal Festival Hall for Jarvis Cocker's Meltdown and a landmark show at Studio Voltaire where they performed with dancing dogs. The show featured Richard Curtis and his dog dancing display team dancing to a special set on the evening of a lunar eclipse. It was broadcast on Resonance 104.4 FM and raised a significant sum towards the upkeep of the radio station.

In 2007, they signed to Mute Records and re-released the underground hit "Darlin'" as a limited edition 12" vinyl. The single had remixes by Andrew Weatherall and Ben Trucker and was listed as one of NME's Tracks of the Year. They recorded the album Welcome to Goon Island at Rockfield Studios in Wales. Silvester and the singer Rich Cash then re-recorded the LP at producer Ross Orton's studio in Sheffield. In the same year, the line-up changed with the bass guitarist Rich Nuvo and the drummer Seb Craig leaving; they were replaced by Jorgen Raa and Macks Faulkron.

Following a succession of singles, including "How to Reduce the Chances of Being a Terror Victim", a satirical recital of Fox News' advice for U.S. citizens, and "The Way We Were", used in an advert for Harley Davidson, the album was released in June 2008 to mixed reviews. A spoken word coda from the political activist Brian Haw concludes the LP with an explanation of the motives behind his long-running peace campaign in Parliament Square.

The band toured with The Kills, Frank Black and The Horrors, amongst others. They appeared on the front cover of Artrocker magazine in May 2007 and again in August 2008. Cerith Wyn Evans, Giles Round, Richard Birkett and Adam Latham designed four separate sleeves for the band's first single; the artwork and design for all subsequent releases was by Latham. Silvester and Cash continue to collaborate but have moved on to new projects, Silvester forming Technology + Teamwork with XX Teens drummer Sarah Jones and Cash forming The Skinjobs with Latham.

== Discography ==
=== Albums ===
- Welcome to Goon Island (30 June 2008) – CD/12" vinyl

=== Singles ===
- "Chasing Your Tail/Pay the Man" (September 2004) – 7" vinyl
- "Round/Man It's Hard to Beat a Woman" (December 2005) – 7" vinyl
- "Onkawara/B-54" (29 January 2007) – 7" vinyl
- "Darlin'" (16 July 2007) – 7" vinyl
- "Darlin'" (20 August 2007) – CD/12" vinyl
- "How to Reduce the Chances of Being a Terror Victim" (25 February 2008) – 7" vinyl
- "The Way We Were" (19 May 2008) – CD
- "Only You" (14 July 2008) – CD/7" vinyl

=== EPs ===
- Xerox Teens (15 May 2006) – 2×7" vinyl
