= Leon Kuhn =

Anti-war political cartoonist

Leon Kuhn (1954 – 2013) was an anti-war political cartoonist who created topical parodies in the United Kingdom and was listed as an initial supporter of Artists against the War. In 1968, when he was 14 years old, Leon won first place in the Sunday Observer's national political cartoon competition. With Colin Gill in 2005 he co-authored the book Topple the Mighty "about knocking down statues of unpopular leaders". The book's foreword was by George Galloway, who Kuhn helped during the 2005 United Kingdom general election. Some of his work was used by Respect – The Unity Coalition from 2005 to 2008 and by the Stop the War Coalition from 2007 onwards. His Statue of Liberty work was used in the film Children of Men.

== Selected works ==
- Big Bang for Bureaucrats: Incorporating an Activist's Anti-nuclear Primer by Leon Kuhn (11 Nov 1983; Burning Issues Ltd; ISBN 978-0-9509045-0-4)
- Statue of Liberty or how the rest of the world sees America. Postcard, 2004
- Topple the Mighty by Leon Kuhn and Colin Gill. (2005, Friction; ISBN 978-0-9549507-4-3)
- Off/On. Postcard, 2009
