= Tom Trusky =

American poet

Anthony Thomas Trusky
- Born: March 14, 1944; Portland, Oregon
- Died: November 27, 2009 (aged 65); Boise, Idaho
- Education: University of Oregon; Northwestern University; Trinity College
- Scientific career
- Fields: Literature
- Workplaces: Boise State University, Hemingway Western Studies Center

Anthony Thomas Trusky (14 March 1944 – 28 November 2009) was an American professor, writer, editor, film historian, and book artist. He was known for promoting poetry of the American West, recovering the films of Nell Shipman, and rediscovering and promoting the work of Idaho outsider artist James Castle. Trusky was a professor of English at Boise State University (1970–2009) and Director of the Hemingway Western Studies Center (1991–2009).

== Early life and education ==
Trusky was born in Portland, Oregon, the oldest of four children. He attended high school in Newport, Oregon, then the University of Oregon (B.A. 1967) and Northwestern University (M.A. 1968). In 1969, he attended Trinity College as a Rotary International Fellow in the Anglo-Irish Literature Program.

== Career ==
=== Teaching ===
In 1970, Trusky began teaching at Boise State College (formerly Boise Junior College, now Boise State University). Trusky taught freshman composition, poetry writing, and book arts. He repudiated the role of imagination in poetry; one student remembers, "I was taking a poetry class and the first thing he said was, 'If anyone wants to write about unicorns, they should consider another class. Unicorns aren't real and shouldn't be read about in poetry," a claim which contradicts the long history of poets writing poems about things that "aren't real," such as Beowulf, The Epic of Gilgamesh, "Ozymandias," William Blake's The Book of Urizen, Milton's Paradise Lost, Rossetti's Goblin Market, Homer's The Odyssey, Keats' Endymion, Byron's Don Juan, and Anne Carson's Autobiography of Red.

The Council for Advancement and Support of Education named Trusky Idaho's Professor of the Year in 1990, 1991, and 1993.

=== cold drill ===
In 1970, Trusky founded cold drill, an annual literary journal published loose-leaf in a box, rather than bound. Cold drill was intended, in Trusky's mind, to "destroy the elitist, old-girl, old-boy networks." With student editors, Trusky produced scratch-and-sniff poetry, paper crafted from Idaho native plants, and a 1985 "All Idaho" edition which featured graphics inspired by graphics on burlap potato sacks. cold drill entered and won first place awards from elite institutions, including the Associated Collegiate Press/National Scholastic Press Association, the Columbia Scholastic Press Association, and the Rocky Mountain Collegiate Press Association.

=== Ahsahta Press ===
In 1974, Trusky, Orvis Burmaster, and Dale Boyer founded Ahsahta Press, which appropriated an indigenous word for bighorn sheep as its name. Under Trusky's editorship, Ahsahta published or reprinted texts by Peggy Pond Church, Genevieve Taggard, H.L. Davis, Hazel Hall, Gwendolen Haste, Haniel Long, David Baker, Katharine Coles, Wyn Cooper, Gretel Ehrlich, Cynthia Hogue, Grace Shuyi Liew, and Linda Bierds. Trusky edited the anthology Women Poets of the West (1978). After Trusky's editorship and under the direction of Janet Holmes, the press' focus shifted from regional to national submissions, publishing poets such as Dan Beachy-Quick, Anne Boyer, Jonah Mixon-Webster, and Paige Ackerson-Kiely.

=== Poetry in Public Places ===
In 1975, Trusky began publishing Poetry in Public Places (PiPP). Each year, nine poems by Boise State University students were printed on posters and distributed to schools, metro buses, and other public venues. Said Trusky: "My goal was to break the neck of rhymed poetry and slap sentimentality useless, and to bring diversity in all its senses: literary, social, political, philosophical, and nonsensical."

=== Nell Shipman ===
After learning that she had shot films at her Lionhead Lodge studio on Northern Idaho's Priest Lake, Trusky began researching the work and life of Canadian born silent screen actor, screenwriter, and producer Nell Shipman, spending over twenty years attempting to promote Shipman's work and recover her extant films. Shipman films began in the former Soviet Union. Trusky recovered and restored Shipman's 1919 film Back to God's Country. Trusky published Shipman's autobiography The Silent Screen and My Talking Heart (1987) as well as Letters from God's Country (2003), a collection of Shipman's correspondence. Kay Armitage, professor of film studies at the University of Toronto and Shipman scholar, credits Trusky with bringing Shipman "back to life". Shipman's extant films are only available on DVD, though a few may be viewed online.

=== James Castle ===
In 1993, Trusky became interested in the life and work of James Castle, a self-taught artist born in Garden Valley. Trusky authored and self-published James Castle: His Life & Art (2004), and contributed to the documentary film Dream House: The Art & Life of James Castle (2008).

=== Hemingway Western Studies Center ===
In 1991 Trusky was named Director of Boise State University's Hemingway Western Studies Center and led a two-year effort that, in 1993, resulted in the Library of Congress designating the Hemingway Western Studies Center as the home of the Idaho Center for the Book (ICB) and in Trusky's appointment as the ICB's director. Trusky published now out of print projects including Idaho by the Book (a literary map of Idaho) and an Idaho Authors card game. He mounted exhibits on topics ranging from pop singer Madonna to zines to "refrigerator art," and published books including Some Zines: American Alternative & Underground Magazines, Newsletters and APAs (1992) and Missing P ges: Idaho & the Book (1994).

=== Book arts ===
A collector of artists' books, Trusky attended courses on book arts, including a sabbatical in New York City spent studying at Columbia University and the Center for Book Arts. Beginning in the 1990s, Trusky taught book arts courses at Boise State University. Former student Andrea Scott recalls that Trusky "promoted my graduate [M.A.] thesis, 'I'm Not Perfect Anyway.' The book combined my interviews and photography of women who had facial scars and how it affected them. Tom saw my vision and said 'Go for it,' even though others thought the project was 'weird' and didn't fit the norm for a graduate thesis. Later, he secretly took my project to New York, where it appeared at an art gallery."

== Personal life ==
Trusky was married to Tara Burt. After their divorce, he later lived with partner, Enver Sulejman.

Trusky died on November 27, 2009. He willed his collection of artists' books, including by James Castle, to Boise State University.

== Selected bibliography ==
=== Books, DVDs, etc. ===
- Dream House: The Art & Life of James Castle. Idaho Center for the Book (DVD) September 2008.
- James Castle: His Life & Art. Boise: Idaho Center for the Book, 2nd rev. ed., 2008.
- michael b.— A Finding. Boise: Painted Smiles Press, 2007.
- At Lionhead Lodge. [DVD]. Boise and Coeur d’Alene: Idaho Film Collection/Pretty Good Productions, 2007.
- James Castle. [Digital slide presentation]. Missoula Art Museum, 15 November 2006.
- PolygamyLand. Boise: Painted Smiles Press, 2006.
- James Castle & the Early Attic Mysteries. [Digital slide presentation]. Boise: 2005.
- Virtual Tour: Evelyn Sooter: Finding Art Everywhere [Digital slide presentation and Idaho Center for the Book web site]. Boise, 2005.
- Postcard from Albania. Boise: Painted Smiles Press, 2005.
- The Book of Everything (Western Edition). Boise: [Painted Smiles Press], 2005.
- James Castle: His Life & Art. Boise: Idaho Center for the Book, 2004.
- Tortillas: A [Glow-in-the-Dark] Book of Miracles. Boise: Painted Smiles Press, 2002.
- Dreamhouse: The Art & Life of James Castle. [Video documentary.] Boise: Painted Smiles Press. Aired, Idaho Public Television, 28 January 2000.
- James Castle & the Book. Boise: Idaho Center for the Book, 1999. [And six Castle facsimile books.]
- James Castle Remembered: The Julia Poems. Boise: Painted Smiles, 1999.
- Some Zines 2: Alternative & Underground Artists' & Eccentric Magazines & Micropresses. Boise: cold-drill books, 1996.
- Missing P ges: Idaho & the Book. Boise: Idaho Center for the Book, 1994.
- Guests. [Zines exhibition guestbook facsimile]. Boise: Hemingway Western Studies Center, 1993.
- Some Zines: American Alternative & Underground Magazines, Newsletters and APAs. Boise: cold drill books & Hemingway Western Studies Center, 1992.

=== Articles, booklets, maps ===
- “To Burn A Book,” Idaho Librarian, 59, 2 (2009) 1–10.
- “Meats Royale,” Book Arts Newsletter (University of the West of England, Bristol), 51 (Aug-Sept 2009) 28–30.
- “Biblio Bullrushes, Biblio Briarpatch: The Search for Carl Maria Seyppel: An In-Progress Documentary in Ten Reels,” Bonefolder, 5, 2 (Spring 2009), 3–22.
- The New U Writings: Boise State University Publications Catalog. Boise State University, 2009.
- “Iraq in Idaho.” Idaho Landscapes: Premiere Issue. (Winter 2008–9).
- “James Castle, Revisited.” The Blue Notebook. Bristol: Fall, 2008.
- Before Sundance: How Nell Shipman Made Her “Little Dramas of the Big Places.” Booklet/lecture at Pacific Northwest Library Association Annual Conference. Post Falls, ID: August 9, 2008.
- “Lady of Lionhead: Nell Shipman.” In 100 Years: The Idaho State Department of Parks & Recreation. Boise, 208.
- “Book Arts at Boise State University/” Bonefolder, IV, 2 (Fall 2007 ) 17–22. http://www.philobiblon.com/bonefolder.
- “Nell Shipman, ‘The Girl from God’s Country,” “The Grub-Stake,” and “At Lionhead: Nell Shipman in Idaho, 1922–1925.” Le Giornate del Cinema Muto Catalog 2007. Pordenone, Italy. Italian and English, 158–160.
- “Printer’s Devils,” http://www.poltroonpress.com (entry posted April, 2007).
- “James Castle,” with Richard Goodman. Fine Books & Collections. (September/October 2005) 22–23.
- “Wolf’s Brush.” 23rd Pordenone Silent Film Festival Catalogue. (Sacile, Italy: 2004) 161–162.
- “Autism, Physiognomy & Letter Forms: The Faces of James Castle.” Journal of Artists’ Books (Fall 2002) 2-20.
- “Reputedly Illiterate: The Art Books of James Castle.” (New York: American Institute of Graphic Arts, 2000).
- “Gallery,” Making Journals (Providence, RI: Rockport Publishing, 2000). Notes for and illustrations of Castle Books.
- “Found & Profound: The Art of James Castle.” Folk Art (Winter 1999/2000) 38–47.
- “Gumby & the Rotarian: James Castle & the Art of Reading.’ The Idaho Review (December 1999) 43–60.
- “The Bookmaker from Garden Valley.” Latitudes [Idaho Commission on the Arts],(Fall 1999) 1–2.
- "Thomas Hornsby Ferril," In 20th Century American Western Writers, Dictionary of Literary Biography. Vol. 206. Detroit, MI: Gale Group, 1999.
- "James Castle & the Burden of Art." Raw Vision (Summer 1998) 38–44.
- "Gifts of Silence: The Art Books of James Castle." Biblio (April 1998) 32–37.
- Idaho Biblio Treasures: Rare, Beautiful and Curious Volumes from Idaho Libraries, Archives and Private Collections. Boise: Idaho Center for the Book, 1997.
- "Illiterates, Childishness, Artists & The Idaho Center for the Book." In Artist's Book Yearbook 1996–97. Stanmore, England: Magpie Press, 1996.
- "In Medias Zines." Serials Review, 21, 2 (March–April), 1996. Selected for reprinting in Alternative Library Literature (7th edition, 1996).
- Idaho by the Book. Tetrateraflexagon Literary Map of Idaho. Boise, ID: Idaho Center for the Book and Idaho Council of Teachers of English, 1996.
- "James Castle & His Airways Coffee Book." High Ground 2(Fall 1996) [five pages, unpaginated, in limited edition artists' magazine].
- "Cranks, Ranters, Ravers." Chronicle of Higher Education, 22 March 1996, B64.
- "James Castle: Idaho's Pioneer Book Artist." Rendezvous, [Idaho State University], 29, 2(Spring 1994 [Winter 1995/6]), 43–48.
- Booker's Dozen: 14 Contemporary Idaho Artist's & Eccentric Books. [Catalog for 1996 Idaho Center for the Book touring exhibition.]
- "Western American Poetry." Encyclopedia of the American West. 4 vols. Macmillan, 1996.
- "Animal Drives: Confessions of an Amateur Film Historian." Film History [London], 6, 1 (Spring 1994), 128–140.
- Booker's Dozen: 14 Contemporary Idaho Artist's & Eccentric Books. [Catalog for 1994 Idaho Center for the Book touring exhibition.]
- Artist's and Eccentric Books on HIV & AIDS. [Catalog for 1993 Boise State University exhibit]
- Pop Up Books for Adults & Other Children. Boise, ID: cold drill books, 1992.
- Triple A: Artist, Artifact & Audience. A Classroom Edition Display Catalogue. Boise, ID: cold drill books, 1991.
- Retold in the Hills. Idaho Centennial Commission, 1990.
- "Literary Magazine Marketing." Clifton Magazine Editor's Manual by Vicki Roland. Clifton College, Cincinnati, OH, 1990.
- "The Only Tough Part About Having to Film in Idaho...": Silent & Talkie Feature Films Made in the Gem State. cold drill books, 1990.
- "Marilyn Monroe, il capo indiano Giuseppe e il Gosfilmofond," trans. Piera Patat, and "Marilyn Monroe, Chief Joseph, and Gosfilmofond." Griffithiana 35/36 (October 1989) 92 101 and 102 110.
- "Nell Shipman. Eine kurze Biographie." Frauen und Film 47 (September 1989) 46 55. Rpt. of "Nell Shipman: Una Breve Biografia."
- “’Cold drill' Offers Innovations for the Literary Magazine." College Media Review, 28, 1(Spring 1989), 13 15.
- "The Woman from God's Country" [with filmography]. Films des Femmes/Festival International de Creteil et du Val du Marne (March 1989).
- Books To Burn (& To Eat, To Smell, To Touch, To Listen To, & To Look At. BSU Department of English [exhibition catalog of eccentric books] (February 1989).
- "Nell Shipman: Una Breve Biografia." Griffithiana 32 33 Settembre 1988) 65 80 [in Italian]; 252 258 [in English].
- Nell Shipman: The Girl From God's Country [program with annotated filmography]. Translator Christian Belaguye. Paris: Musee D'Orsay (June 1988).
- "Poets of the West, Circa 1850 1950" and "Thomas Hornsby Ferril" [chapters with notes, annotated primary and secondary bibliographies]. In A Literary History of the American West (Fort Worth, TX: Texas Christian University Press and The Western American Literature Association, 1987) 180 203, 887 895.
- "Expatriate Idaho Writers & Artists," in cold drill EXTRA (October, 1984) 1 28.
- Idaho Films: Hollywood Feature Films Made in the Gem State [20 page booklet] (Boise, ID: BSU Student Programs Board, 1984).
- "Ahsahta Press," Idaho English Journal, VI, 2(Fall 1983) 14.
- "Censorship and Idaho Libraries," cold drill EXTRA (October 1983) 5 17, 18 21.
- "Book Censorship in Idaho Public Libraries," Pacific Northwest Library Association Quarterly, IV, 4(Summer 1982) 5 13.
- "Norman Wicklund Macleod: Poet from the West," Prairie Schooner (Fall 1976) 257 268. Reprinted in Pembroke Magazine, 12(1980) 32 39.
- Thomas Hornsby Ferril [52 page pamphlet]. Boise, ID: BSC Western Writers Series, 1974.

=== Poetry ===
- Two poems in Idaho's Poetry: A Centennial Anthology (Moscow: University of Idaho Press, 1989).
- "Invitation, for the Idaho Commission on the Arts." Broadside [self-published] (1 March 1989).
- "Orange & Purple." Boise Magazine (January/February 1989).
- "Atomic City." Redneck Review of Literature (Fall 1988) 37.
- "Ficus, Coleus, On the ." Boise Magazine (May/June 1988) 48.
- "Idaho's Congressional Representative Speaks In Favor Of Televising Gary Gilmore's Execution By Riflesquad In Utah," "On Understanding Dow," "Ghost Dance." In The Literature of Idaho, ed. James Maguire (Boise, ID: Hemingway Western Studies Series, 1986) 319 322.
- "Yucca." Western Juried Poetry Exhibition, Utah Arts Council/Tour of the West, 1979 1980.
- "The Cat Man Of Bella Street," "Idaho's Congressional Representative Speaks...," "On Understanding Dow," "Ghost Dance," Regeneration Through Violence," Authorities Are Baffled: The Boise, Idaho, North End Firebug Strikes Only In Summer," "Mohave," "Muzzy And Grey, The Hawk Man Returns," "Renewal, Or Poem Writ With The Modest Intention Of Saving The North End," "The Way To Enlo." In Eight Idaho Poets: An Anthology, ed. Ron McFarland (Moscow, ID: University Press of Idaho University of Idaho Press, 1979) 43 64.
- "Wayne Rongey, 2714 Stewart Street, Climbs One Of Our Elms And Stops The City's Road Improvement Crew." The Slackwater Review (Winter 1978 79) 64.
- "Idaho's Congressional...," "Ghost Dance," "Mohave," "The Way To Enlo." Beyond Baroque Magazine (July 1978) 7 50.
- "Idaho Has Fifty Two Peaks Above 10,000 Feet," "Why, To This Day, My Father Does Not Like Pineapple," "'These Two Navajo Families Have Me Pull Over In The Desert Between Holbrook And Gallup The Middle Of Nowhere And Walk Off!' (The Englishmen Are As Astounded As The Greyhound Driver," "The Title Page: Confucius the Secular as Sacred; Below, It Is Written: 'the text of this paper is printed on 100% recycled paper.'" Pembroke Magazine 8 (1976) 66 69, 174 175.
- "On Being Left To Fend For Oneself One Weekend And Suddenly Inspecting The Simplicity And/Or Diminution Of One's Philosophy," "Vacation." The Slackwater Review 1, 2(Winter 1976) 67 68.
- "Why, To This Day, My Father Does Not Like Pineapple," South Dakota Review 14, 3(Autumn 1976) 85 86.
- "Advising Anna Doolittle The White Antelope Allusion Will Escape Her Readers." In Poets West: An Anthology of Contemporary Poets from the Eleven Western States, ed. Lawrence P. Spingarn (Los Angeles: Perivale Press, 1976) 146.
