= Grace Shuyi Liew =

Malaysian writer

Grace Shuyi Liew is a Malaysian American writer. In 2019, she published her debut poetry collection, Careen, with Noemi Press, and in 2022, she won the Stella Kupferberg Memorial Short Story Prize. Concerning themes of nationhood; identities of race, class, and gender/sexuality; among others, her works of poetry, fiction, and criticism have appeared in the Kenyon Review, Electric Literature, Guernica, and other publications.

== Early life ==
Liew was born in and grew up in Malaysia and later moved to the United States for college.

== Career ==
In 2016, Liew released the chapbook Prop with Ahsahta Press after Kerri Webster had selected it for the 2015 Ahsahta Chapbook Award. The same year, she released Book of Interludes with Anomalous Press.

In 2019, Liew released Careen, her debut collection of poetry published by Noemi Press. The Rumpus hailed Liew's "entrancing voice, enormously creative language, and surprising infusion of offbeat humor", and the Adroit Journal lauded Liew's approach to facilitating discourse about identity that also interrogate systems and structures. Bustle and several other publications recommended it on lists for LGBTQ poetry. The same year, Liew was included in the 2019 Best of the Net anthology for her poem, "The Use of Lyricism", in the Kenyon Review. One year later, in 2020, Liew was designated an Emerging Writer Fellow by the Center for Fiction.

Liew's short story, "Make Yourself Into a House", was selected by Min Jin Lee for Selected Shorts' Stella Kupferberg Memorial Short Story Prize in 2022. It was one of Electric Literature's most read pieces that year. The same year, Liew earned a MacDowell Fellowship for literature; there, she worked on a novel-in-progress about a fictional gambling city in Malaysia. In 2023, Liew was a writer-in-residence at Tin House.

== Writing ==
Liew's writing in several genres have been published in numerous publications. Her fiction has appeared in Guernica, The Offing, Wigleaf, and others; her Wigleaf story, "Splinter", was nominated for a Pushcart Prize. Her poetry has appeared in the Asian American Writers' Workshop's The Margins, Honey Literary, Banango Street, and others. Her critical essays and interviews have appeared in the Kenyon Review, Waxwing, and Fanzine.
