= United States Park Police =

Uniformed federal law enforcement agency

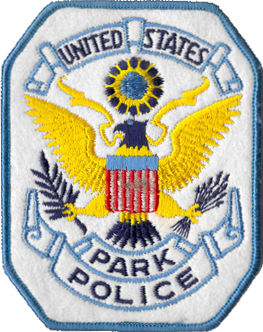
- Patch of the USPP

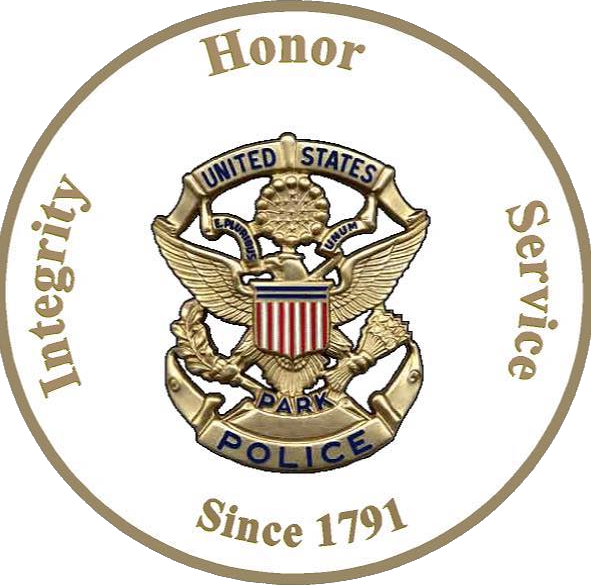
- Seal of the United States Park Police

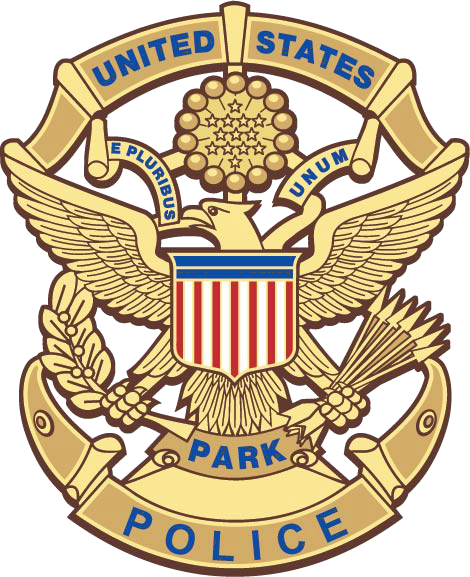
- Badge of a USPP officer
- Common name: U.S. Park Police
- Abbreviation: USPP
- Motto: Integrity, Honor, Service

Agency overview
- Formed: December 14, 1919; 106 years ago
- Preceding agency: Park Watchmen (1791)

Jurisdictional structure
- Federal agency (Operations jurisdiction): United States
- Operations jurisdiction: United States
- Legal jurisdiction: National Park Service areas, primarily located in the Washington, D.C., San Francisco, and New York City areas and certain other government lands.
- General nature: Federal law enforcement; Civilian police
- Specialist jurisdiction: Environment, parks, heritage property

Operational structure
- Headquarters: Washington, D.C.
- Sworn members: 605
- Agency executive: Scott Brecht, Chief
- Parent agency: National Park Service

Website
- https://www.nps.gov/subjects/uspp/index.htm

The United States Park Police (USPP) functions as a full-service law enforcement agency with responsibilities and jurisdiction in those National Park Service areas primarily located in the Washington, D.C., San Francisco, and New York City areas and certain other government lands. United States Park Police officers have jurisdictional authority in the surrounding metropolitan areas of the three cities it primarily operates in, meaning they possess both state and federal authority. In addition to performing the normal crime prevention, investigation, and apprehension functions of an urban police force, the Park Police are responsible for policing many of the famous monuments in the United States.

The USPP shares law enforcement jurisdiction in all lands administered by the National Park Service with a force of National Park Service Law Enforcement Rangers tasked with the same law enforcement powers and responsibilities. The agency also provides protection for the president, secretary of the interior, and visiting dignitaries. The Park Police is an operation of the National Park Service, which is an agency of the United States Department of the Interior. As of April 8, 2022, the force has 494 officers.

== History ==
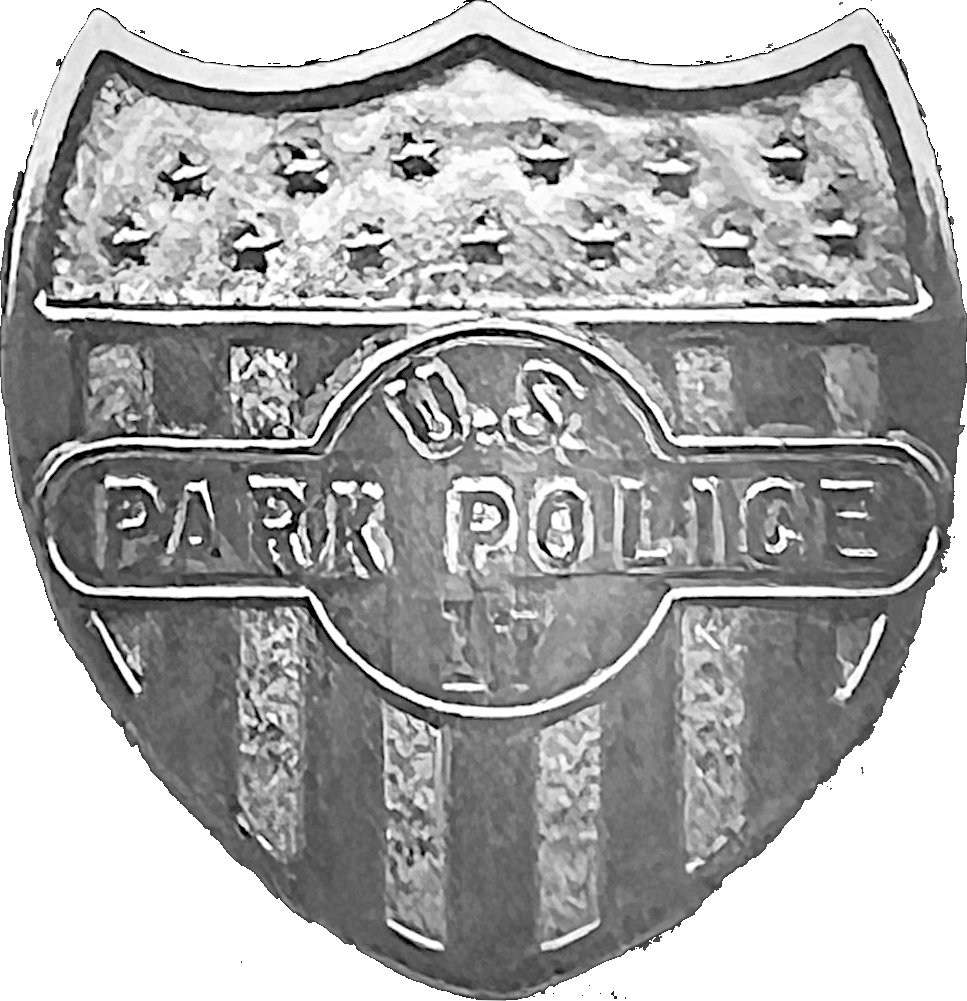
USPP badge in 1903

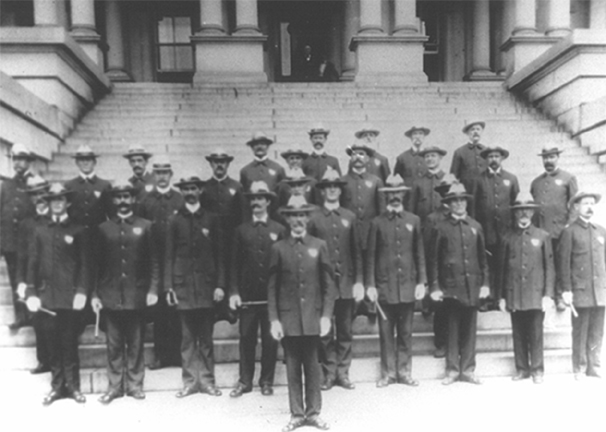
U.S. Park Police in the early 20th century

The Park Watchmen were first recruited in 1791 by George Washington to protect federal property in the District of Columbia. The police functioned as an independent agency of the federal government until 1849, when it was placed under the jurisdiction of the Department of the Interior. In 1867, Congress transferred the police to the Office of Public Buildings and Grounds, under the supervision of the Chief of Engineers of the Army Corps of Engineers. The Watchmen were given the same powers and duties as the Metropolitan Police of Washington in 1882. Their name was officially changed to the present United States Park Police in 1919. In 1925, Congress placed the Park Police in the newly created Office of Public Buildings and Public Parks of the National Capital. Headed by an Army officer, Lt. Col. Ulysses S. Grant III, the office reported directly to the president of the United States. In 1933, President Franklin Delano Roosevelt transferred the police to the National Park Service. Beatrice V. Ball joined the force in January 1942 as the first woman.

Their authority first began to expand outside D.C. in 1929, and today they are primarily responsible for the Gateway National Recreation Area units in New York City-New Jersey and the Golden Gate National Recreation Area in San Francisco, as well as the many designated areas in Washington, D.C., and the neighboring counties in Maryland and Virginia. These sites include the National Mall, the C&O Canal towpath in the region, and the parallel roadways of the George Washington Memorial Parkway in Virginia and Clara Barton Parkway in Maryland, as well as the federally maintained segment of the Baltimore Washington Parkway in Maryland.

== Equipment ==
The current sidearm is the Glock 45 Gen 5 MOS which will be replacing the SIG Sauer P320 which replaced the Heckler & Koch P2000 in service.

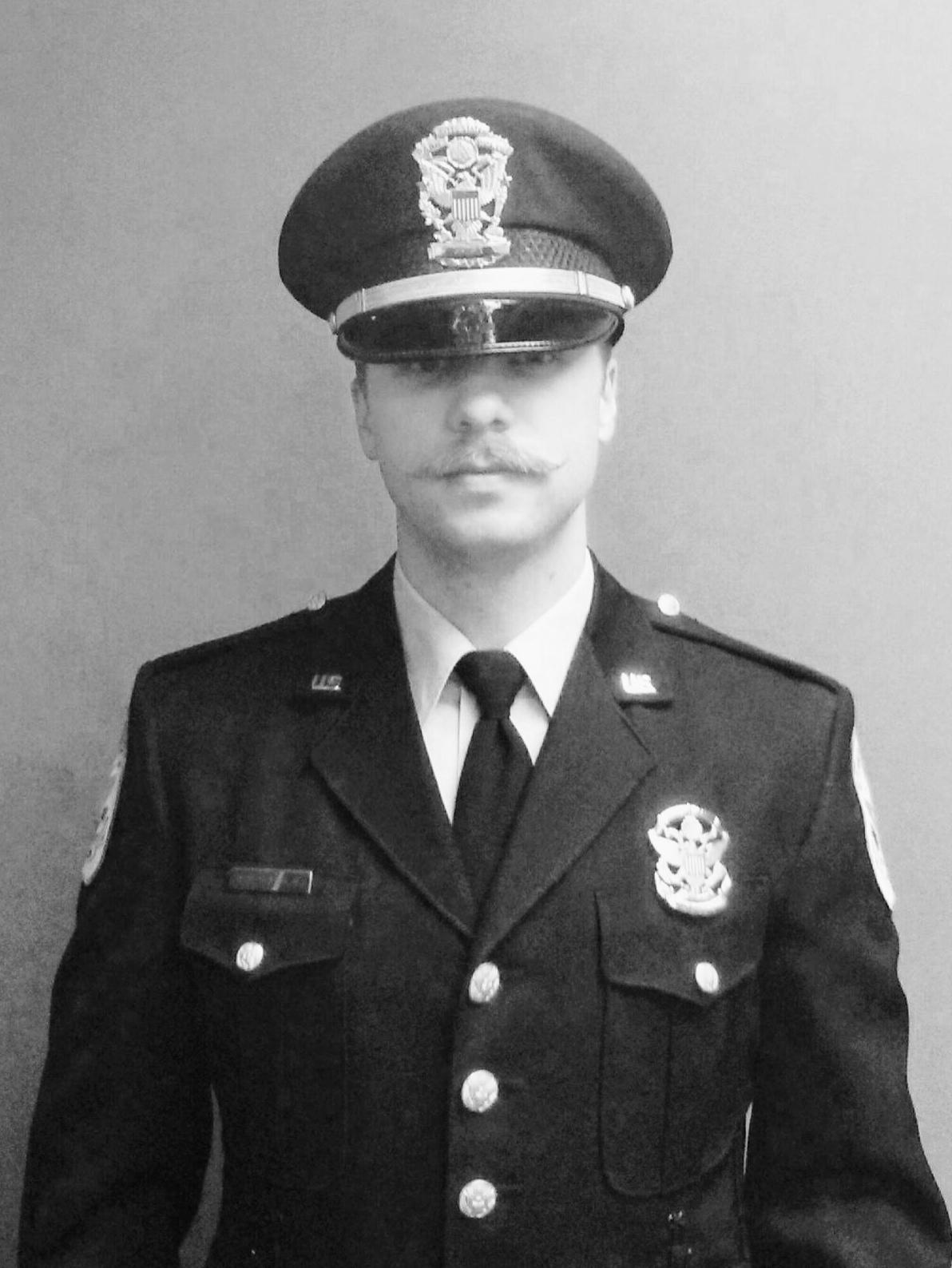
US Park Police Officer in Class A Dress Blouse

== Authority ==
The force functions as a unit of the National Park Service with jurisdiction in all federal parks.

U.S. Park Police officers are located in the Washington, DC, New York City, and San Francisco metropolitan areas, and investigate and detain persons suspected of committing offenses against the United States.

Officers also carry out services for many notable events conducted in the national parks.

The U.S. Park Police are able to effect an arrest without a warrant in any unit of the National Park System, the District of Columbia, and the environs of the District of Columbia.

Park Police have authority to follow a vehicle outside their jurisdiction if the offense was committed within the park. According to Park Police policy, lethal force can only be used when there is "imminent danger of death or serious bodily harm".

=== Virginia ===
In Virginia, USPP Officers are provided with Conservator of the Peace powers as set forth in 19.2-12 of the Code of Virginia with powers and duties provided under 19.2-18 of the Code of Virginia.

=== Washington, D.C. ===
In Washington, D.C., itself, USPP Officers have the same powers and duties as the D.C. Metropolitan Police.

=== Maryland ===
USPP Officers possess a limited arrest authority in the State of Maryland.

=== New York and New Jersey ===
The U.S. Park Police hold state arrest authority in New York [New York State CPL 2.15 part 9], and state arrest authority in New Jersey [New Jersey Code 2A:154-6].

=== California ===
In California, arrest powers are provided under California Penal Code Section 830.8.

=== Federal and state powers ===
These state arrest powers are in addition to powers held as federal officers. The U.S. Park Police primarily enforce laws including but not limited to Title 36 of the Code of Federal Regulations (CFR) and other federal statutes such as 16 USC and 18 USC, as well as state and local laws.

=== Leadership ===
In May 2023, Jessica M. E. Taylor replaced Pamela A. Smith as the chief of the US Park Police. Taylor came to the role with 25 years of experience in federal law enforcement, previously having served as a special agent in U.S. Secret Service, Assistant Special Agent-in-Charge at the U.S. Department of Agriculture's Office of the Inspector General, and Director of the Environmental Protection Agency's (EPA) Criminal Investigation Division.

Christopher S. Cunningham serves as the Assistant Chief of Police, and Jeffrey E. Schneider, Scott H. Brecht, and Lelani S. Woods Serve as Deputy Chiefs.

=== Districts ===
The United States Park Police operates patrol district stations in the New York City, San Francisco, and Washington, D.C., metropolitan areas.

U.S. Park Police officers are charged with protecting national icons such as the Statue of Liberty, the Washington Monument, the Lincoln Memorial, the Jefferson Memorial, and other well known monuments and memorials. This is accomplished through the Homeland Security Division, which consists of the Intelligence/Counter-Terrorism Unit, the New York field office, and the Icon Protection Branch, which consists of the Central District Station and Special Forces.

=== Specialized units ===
The U.S. Park Police manages a Marine Unit, an Aviation Unit, Special Weapons and Tactics Team (SWAT), a Canine Unit, a Motorcycle Unit, a Special Events Unit, a Traffic Safety Unit, a Horse Mounted Unit and a Criminal Investigations Branch.

==== Aviation ====
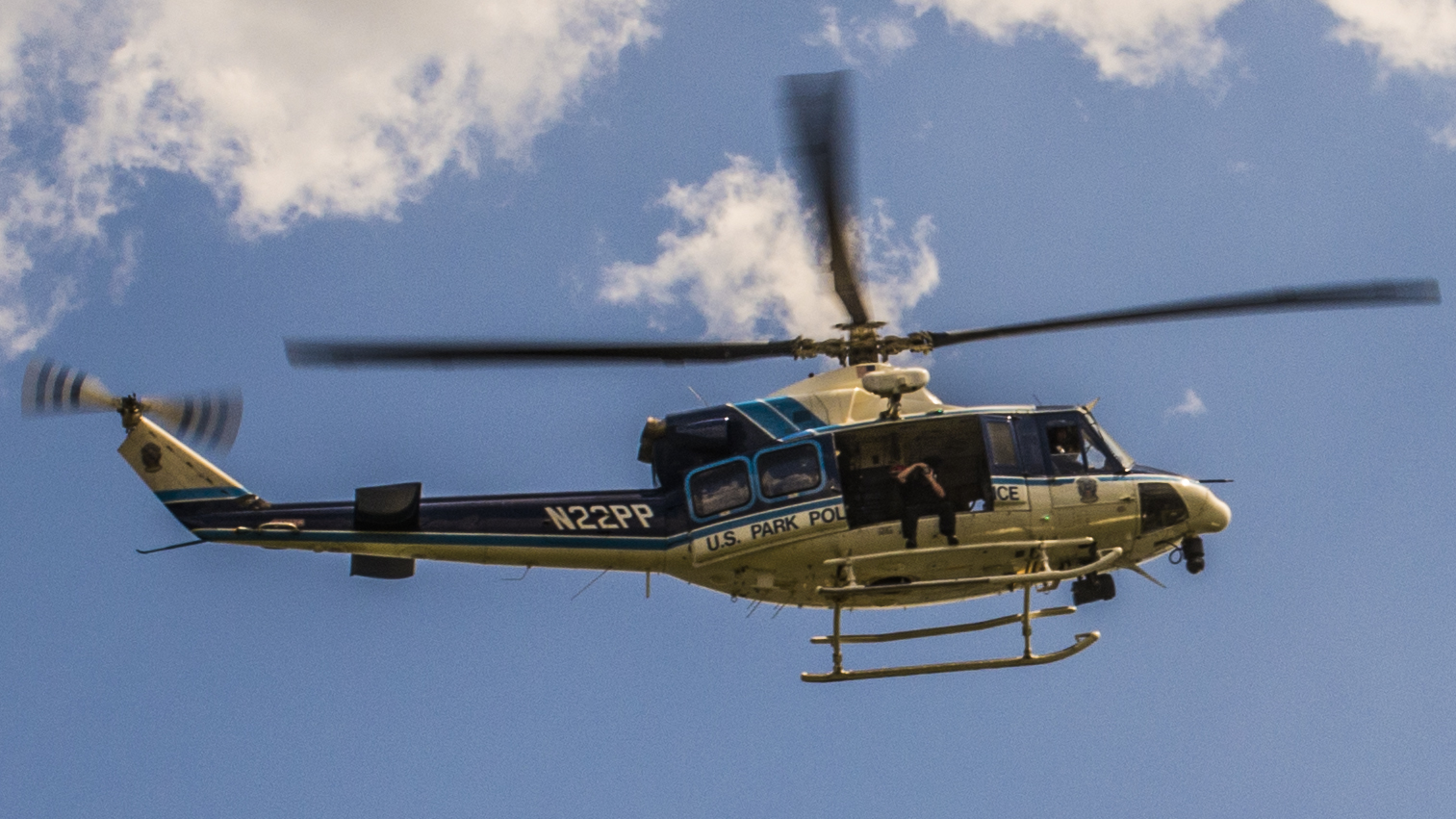
U.S. Park Police helicopter, Washington, D.C., August 24, 2013.

The missions of the United States Park Police Aviation Unit include aviation support for law enforcement, medevac, search and rescue, high-risk prisoner transport and presidential and dignitary security. The Aviation Unit has provided accident-free, professional aviation services for over 40 years. They were the first helicopter provider of Air medical services within Washington, D.C, and continue to provide these services 24/7 to the district and neighboring jurisdictions. They also provide an invaluable resource for patrolling and performing rescues at the numerous federal parks and recreation areas within the National Capital Region, such as Great Falls Park and Shenandoah National Park. Like many park environments, injured parties in these remote and difficult to access locations require specialized rescue equipment to access and retrieve persons in distress. The US Park Police Aviation Unit is the primary resource for these remote rescues requiring helicopter access.

The Aviation Unit of the United States Park Police began in April 1973 and was placed under the command of Lt. Richard T. Chittick. It started with one Bell 206B JetRanger and a staff of three pilots and three rescue technicians based at the Anacostia Naval Air Station in a shared space with the MPD Aviation Branch. A second helicopter, a Bell 206B-3 JetRanger, was added in 1975 and the unit relocated to Andrews AFB. The Aviation Unit moved to its present facility in Anacostia Park, the "Eagle's Nest," in 1976. In 1983, the 206B-3 was upgraded to a Bell206L-3 LongRanger. Their first twin-engine helicopter, a Bell 412SP, and the third helicopter to carry the designation "Eagle One," was placed in service in January 1991. The unit grew to its current staff, and began providing 24-hour coverage in January 1994.

In August 1999, the unit took delivery of its second twin-engine helicopter, a Bell 412EP. It became the fourth helicopter in the unit's history to carry the designation "Eagle One" and the same registration number as that of an earlier aircraft whose crew affected the rescue of victims after the crash of Air Florida Flight 90. In May 2016, the unit received a replacement for "Eagle Two" with a used & reconditioned Bell 412EP to replace the aging aircraft delivered in 1991.

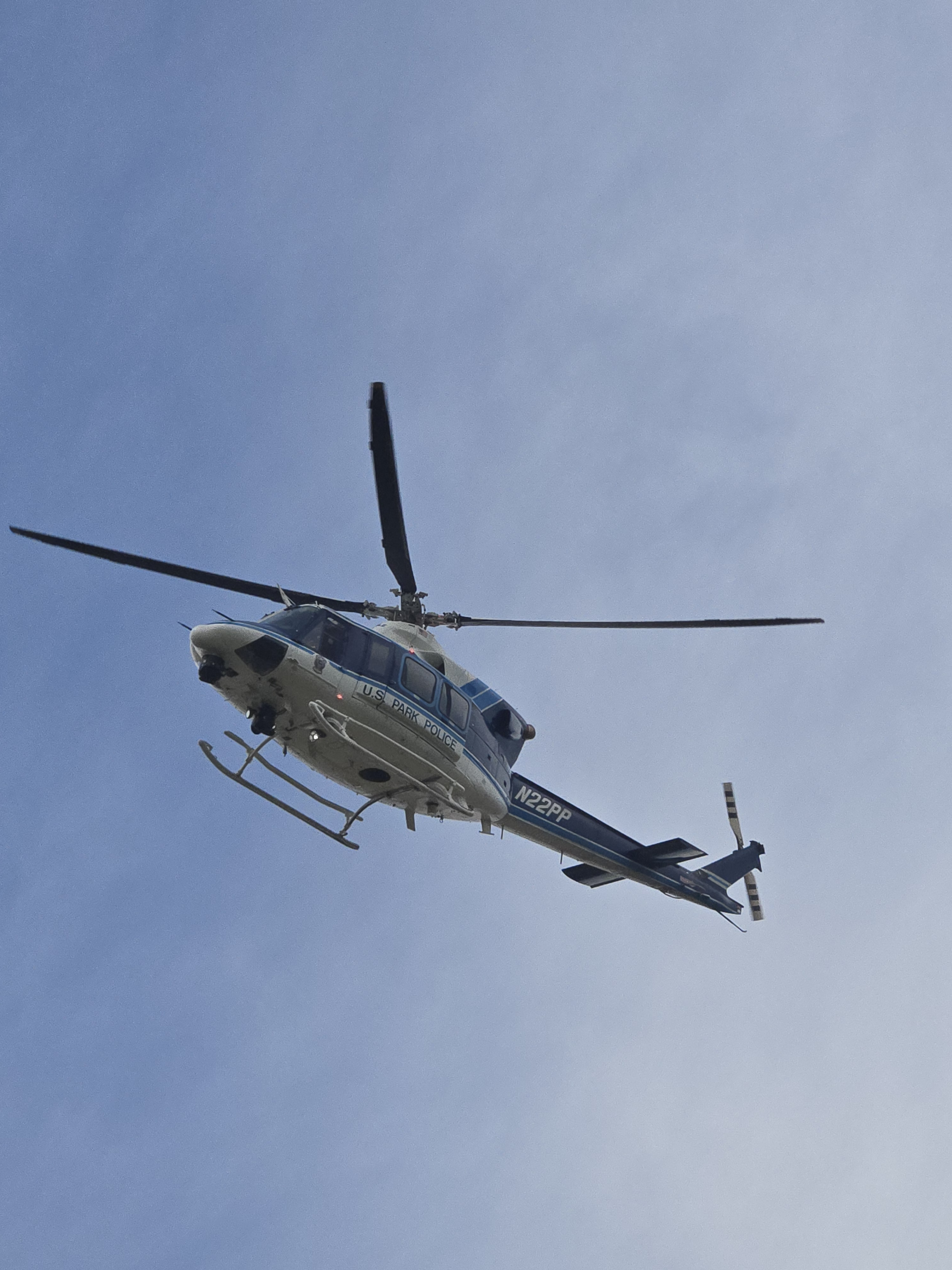
U.S. Park Police helicopter around Washington Monument, March 20, 2026.

The crews of U.S. Park Police Aviation resources are frequently called to assist at significant and historical disasters and emergency incidents throughout the National Capital Region. These incidents include the September 11 attacks on the Pentagon, the D.C. sniper attacks throughout the region, the 1982 crashing of Air Florida Flight 90, and the 2013 Washington Navy Yard shooting. During the June 2017 Congressional baseball shooting, the crews of U.S. Park Police Aviation responded with two helicopters and transported Congressman Steve Scalise and a U.S. Capitol Police Officer to the trauma center at MedStar Washington Hospital Center.

== Organization and rank structure ==
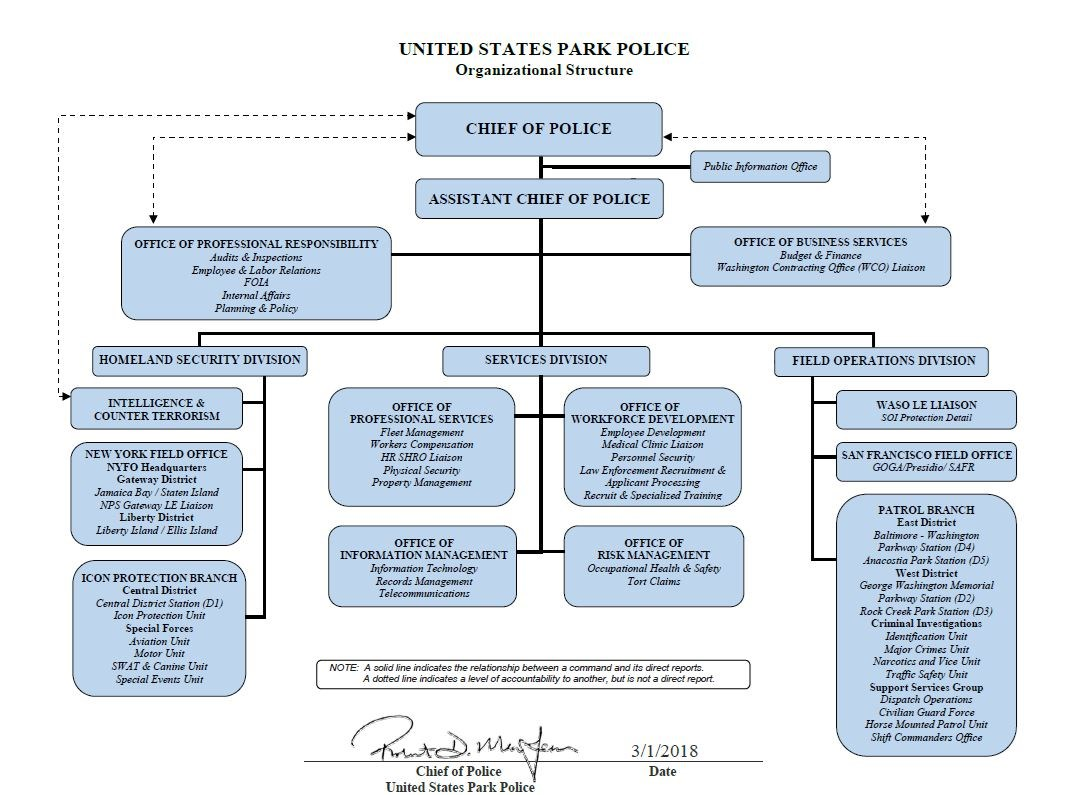
Organization chart of the USPP

Title	Insignia
Chief of Police	
Assistant Chief	
Deputy Chief	
Major	
Captain	
Lieutenant	
Sergeant	
Officer/Detective	N/A

== Notable events ==
In January 1982 USPP helicopter pilot Don Usher and his partner Gene Windsor saved the lives of five passengers from the Air Florida Flight 90 crash. Usher and Windsor, at great risk to themselves and lacking a winch or any sort of rescue equipment, flew their Bell 206 "Eagle Two" inches above the frozen Potomac River to pull the survivors from the 34 °F (1.1 °C) water before depositing them ashore for waiting ambulance crews. At one point, Usher flew the helicopter so close to the river that the skids went below the water as Windsor stood on them to tie a rescue line around surviving flight attendant Kelly Duncan, who couldn't grip the life preserver thrown to her due to hypothermia. She was lifted to shore after spending 25 minutes in the freezing river.

In December 1982, Norman Mayer threatened to blow up the Washington Monument with a truck he said contained explosives. A standoff with U.S. Park police began at 9:20 in the morning. It ended ten hours later after the suspect backed up the truck, then surged forward. Police fired dozens of shots at the tires and engine block, overturning the van. One of the bullets ricocheted and fatally struck Mayer in the head. No explosives were found in the van.

In 1989, Officers David Duffey and William Lovegrove rescued two people in the Glen Echo Flood after a parking lot collapsed.

In 1990, Officer Katherine Heller was at Lafayette Park when she was approached by a man who had been assaulted. After Heller radioed a description of the attacker, another Park Police officer, Scott Dahl, spotted a man matching the description and approached him. The alleged assailant began fighting with the officer and wrested the officer's service pistol away from him. Heller approached and shot the man in the chest. For this act of valor, Heller was named Police Officer of the Year by Parade Magazine and the International Association of Chiefs of Police. She was the first U.S. Park Police officer, and the first female officer, to receive the IACP award.

In 1993, officers of the Park Police rescued passengers of the Golden Venture ship, which had run aground on the beach at Fort Tilden in Rockaway, Queens. Park police officers were the first to arrive on the scene. After calling for backup, they ran into the ocean and pulled survivors from the cold water.

In 1994 Park Police shot and killed a homeless man on the sidewalk in front of the White House. The man was brandishing a large hunting knife taped to his hand and refused to surrender during a confrontation with the officers.

The two helicopters of the U.S. Park Police played an important role after the September 11 attacks on the Pentagon. The crews responded immediately, transporting injured personnel to hospitals. The helicopters served as a command and control platform, using their Forward Looking Infrared equipment to provide firefighters with intelligence about the scope and spread of the fire through the five rings of the structure, and taking over air traffic control for the Washington, D.C., airspace after the controllers at Washington National Airport had to evacuate due to thick smoke.

In 2011, U.S. Park Police conducted an investigation after the arrest of five dancers at the Jefferson Memorial. In a video posted to YouTube, Park Police appeared to body slam and choke an individual who was silently dancing. The dance was in protest of the ban on dancing at memorials. Judge Thomas B. Griffith ruled the arrests did not violate the dancers’ first amendment rights in Oberwetter v. Hilliard.

U.S. Park Police played a role in the Washington Navy Yard shooting on September 16, 2013. Two U.S. Park Police officers, Andrew Wong and Carl Hiott, were involved in the response. The shooter was killed by D.C. Police Emergency Response Team officer Dorian DeSantis, who took fire, and a U.S. Park Police Officer. U.S. Park Police Eagle 1 also conducted a rescue mission and removed an injured shooting victim from the roof of building 197 along with three other survivors ultimately saving their lives.

In 2014, Park Police launched a crackdown on food truck operators. Park Police handcuffed food vendors who were selling to tourists on the National Mall. Vendors suggested that the enforcement was to protect the revenue from the government's food stands. By September 2014, Park Police had arrested 196 people over the year for vending without a license on the mall, some of whom were jailed.

In 2015, U.S. Park Police detained an on-duty Secret Service special agent who was part of a detail for US Homeland Security Secretary Jeh Johnson. The Park Police were sued following the incident for violating the Fourth Amendment protections against unreasonable seizures.

In 2016, Park Police aggressively enforced traffic regulations outside Arlington National Cemetery. Officers hid behind bushes to catch cabdrivers picking up passengers, claiming that idling cars were parked. Charges brought by the Park Police were dropped on appeal.

In 2017, Park Police handcuffed teens who were selling water on the National Mall. DC Councilmember Charles Allen asked whether arresting the teens was the appropriate response.

In November 2017, Park Police shot and killed Bijan Ghaisar, an unarmed Virginia man after a hit and run and three separate vehicle pursuits. More than eight months after the incident, Park Police provided no explanation for the killing. According to a lawsuit filed by the family, it was twelve hours following the incident before the family learned that Park Police were involved. Two days after the shooting, Park Police Chief Robert MacLean met with the family. MacLean offered condolences but provided no information about what had happened. The Ghaisar family was not allowed to touch their son for three days following the incident, when he was guarded by the department's officers. According to the family, when a doctor arrived to examine Ghaisar for organ donation, the Park Police denied access, declaring the brain-dead man "under arrest" and his body "evidence." More than nine months after the incident, Chief MacLean refused to speak to media about the incident, while Fairfax County Police, who filmed the shooting, said that the episode showed that greater transparency was needed. After more than a year and in response to a lawsuit, US Park Police named the shooters as officers Lucas Vinyard and Alejandro Amaya. The incident was not captured on a body cam, since Park Police are forbidden from wearing body cameras while on the job. In a 2015 memo written by Chief MacLean, he told the entire force not to use any audio or video recorders "while on duty". MacLean claimed that the lack of a department-wide policy justified the ban on cameras. Following the shooting, in 2018 DC Congressional Delegate Eleanor Holmes Norton introduced a bill to require uniformed federal police officers to wear body cameras and have dashboard cameras in marked vehicles. The legislation was directly in response to Ghaisar's death. Chief MacLean backed out of a scheduled meeting with Holmes Norton and Representative Don Beyer to discuss the matter, prompting Holmes Norton to make a statement to "express our astonishment" at his absence. More than two years after the killing, Park Police had not launched an internal investigation into the matter or released recordings of the 911 calls the Park Police received.

In 2019, the sexual assault of a female Park Police officer by her male colleague two years earlier was disclosed. The attack occurred inside a Park Police station. Despite a protection order requiring 100 yards of distance between the two officers, Park Police continued to assign the officers to roles where they might be in contact. The assaulting officer was not suspended or terminated.

On June 1, 2020, USPP officers cleared the streets bordering Lafayette Park, DC of protesters on the order of Attorney General William Barr. Reporting news crews, Rev. Gini Gerbasi of St. John's Episcopal, and many protesters noted the use of tear gas, flashbangs, and rubber bullets to disperse the peaceful crowds. Park Police officers on foot, and mounted on horseback, used riot gear such as batons and shields to drive assembled crowds further away from the park. The USPP released a statement that stated "no tear gas was used" by any law enforcement agency during the incident. Media subsequently reported that USPP assaulted the protesters with pepper spray canisters, which were found at the scene. Australian journalists who were reporting live from the scene were assaulted by Park Police during the operation. The incident prompted a diplomatic complaint by the Australian government. Two park police officers were assigned to administrative duties. This specific incident was referred to the Department of the Interior's Office of the Inspector General but that investigation was still ongoing as of August 2021 and no relevant report currently appears on the OIG website. In June 2021, the Department of the Interior, Inspector General, issued its Review of U.S. Park Police Actions at Lafayette Park, and stated the Secret Service acted contrary to the operational plan and before the Park Police gave any dispersal warnings to the crowd. The Secret Service began advancing seven minutes before any dispersal order was given. The early deployment increased tensions between law enforcement officers and protestors. They faced resistance and used pepper spray in response to eggs and bottles being thrown at them. Park Police officers also began to clear the crowd before completing the final dispersal orders and 25 minutes before a planned curfew that was earlier announced by the mayor. Park Police commanders could not say who issued the order to deploy or why police radio transmissions were not recorded as required.

In July 2021, a unanimous jury awarded $730,000 in a police misconduct case against two Park Police officers for unlawfully detaining and taunting a man with their weapons while cursing at him despite having no suspicion of criminal activity on the man's part.

On September 9, 2023, Mikhail Olson, a popular Roblox developer was arrested by United States Park Police Officers after a concealed unattended firearm was located at the Roblox Developer Conference at Fort Mason in San Francisco, California. Officers also discovered an illegal large-capacity magazine and armor-piercing ammunition. Mikhail Olson attempted to evade the officers. He was booked into the San Francisco County Jail.

In 2023, an off duty Park Police officer shot a colleague while the two were inside an apartment with others. Alcohol was involved in the incident in which Park Police officer Alexander Roy was attempting to "dry load" a firearm, when it discharged, killing a fellow officer. Roy was charged with involuntary manslaughter.

== Locations ==
Below is a partial list of areas policed by the United States Park Police.

- Washington, D.C.
  - Washington Monument
  - Lincoln Memorial
  - Jefferson Memorial
  - Lafayette Square, Washington, D.C.
  - The Ellipse
  - National Mall – from the Capitol Reflecting Pool to the Potomac River
  - Rock Creek Park
  - Baltimore-Washington Parkway
- San Francisco Bay Area, California
  - Golden Gate National Recreation Area
  - Marin Headlands
  - Baker Beach
  - Presidio of San Francisco
- New York (state)
  - Statue of Liberty
  - Gateway National Recreation Area

== Gallery ==
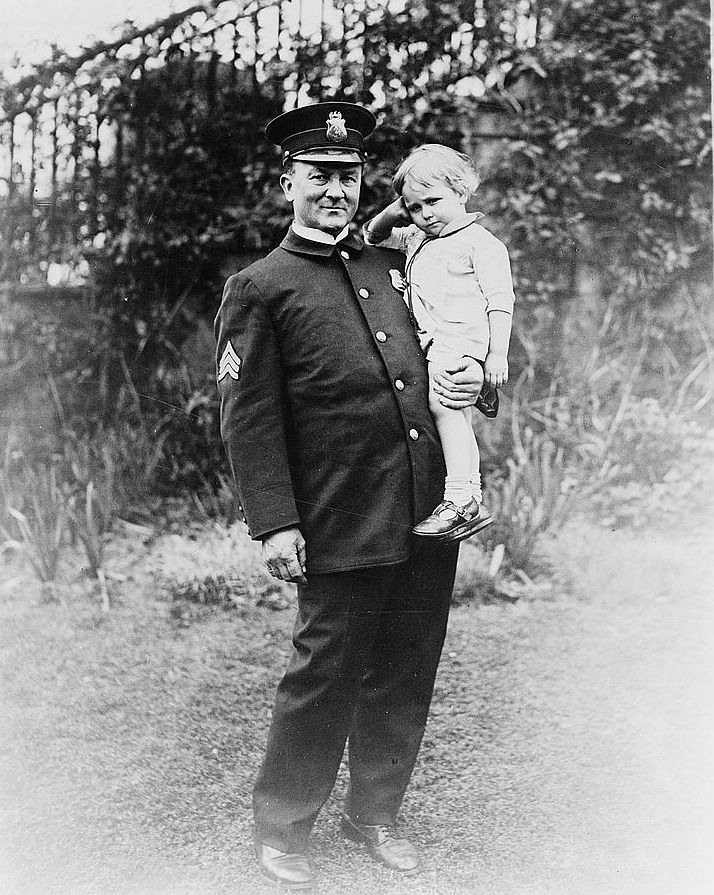
One of the "tragedies" of the Easter egg rolling at the White House. At one time Sgt. McQuade of the White House Police had eight youngsters who had strayed from their parents. All were safely returned April 17, 1922

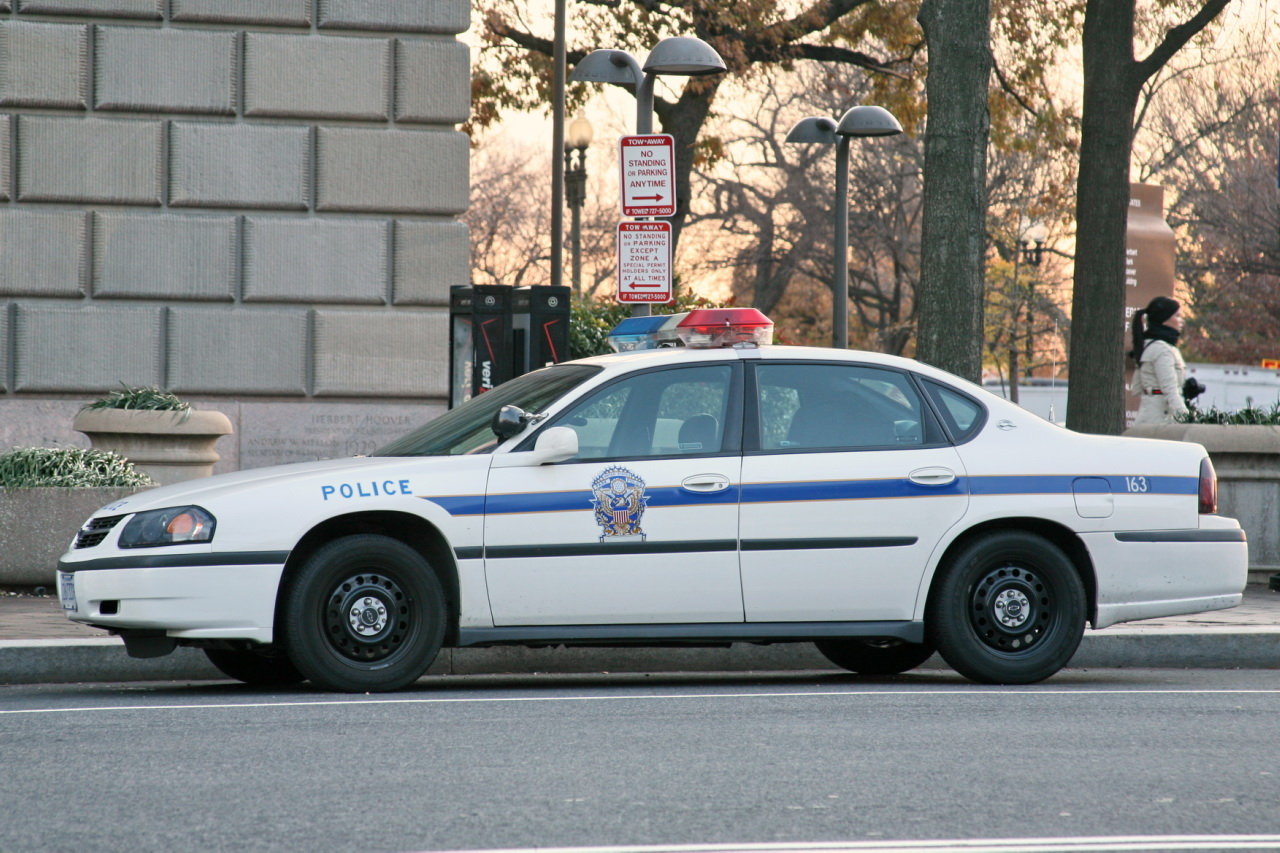
A discontinued Chevrolet Impala police car used by the U.S. Park Police.

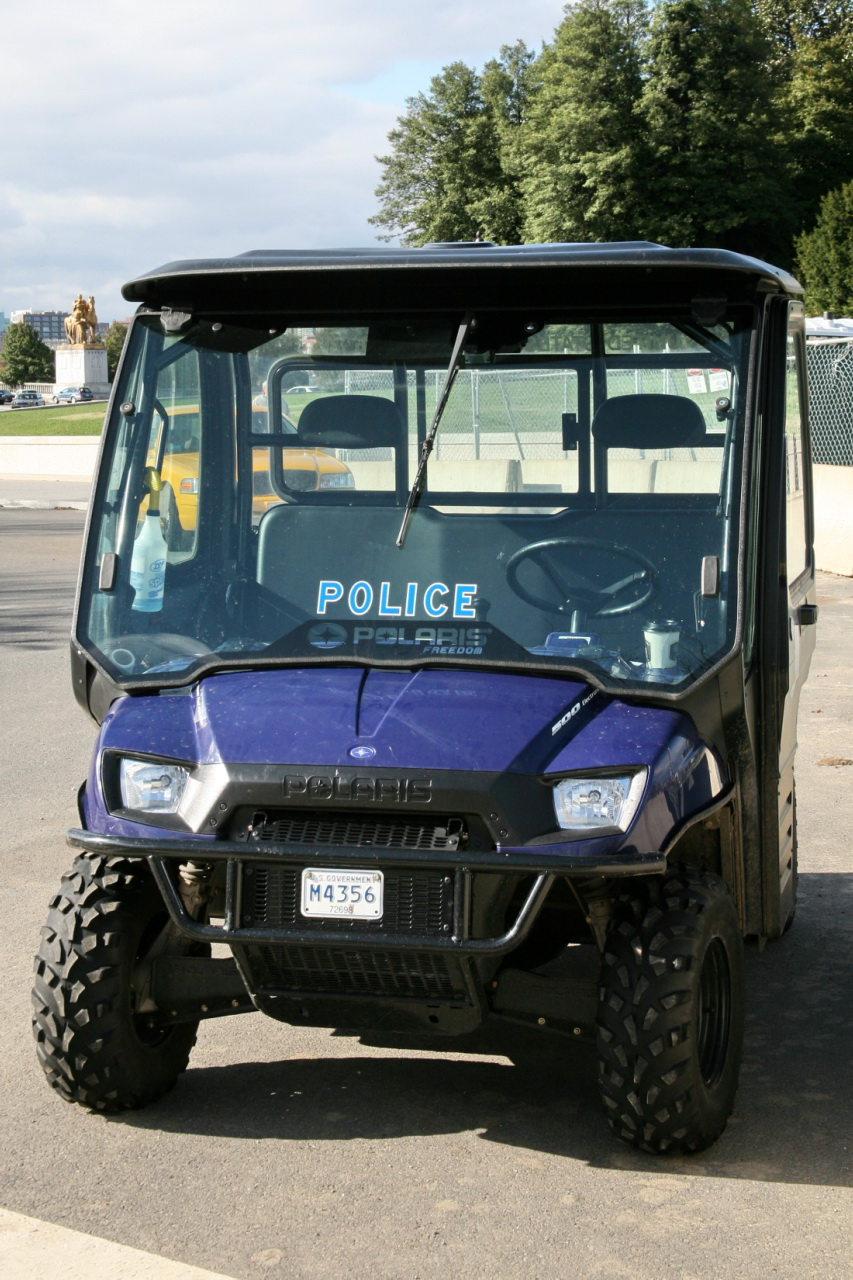
A Polaris Ranger off-road vehicle that is used by the U.S. Park Police.

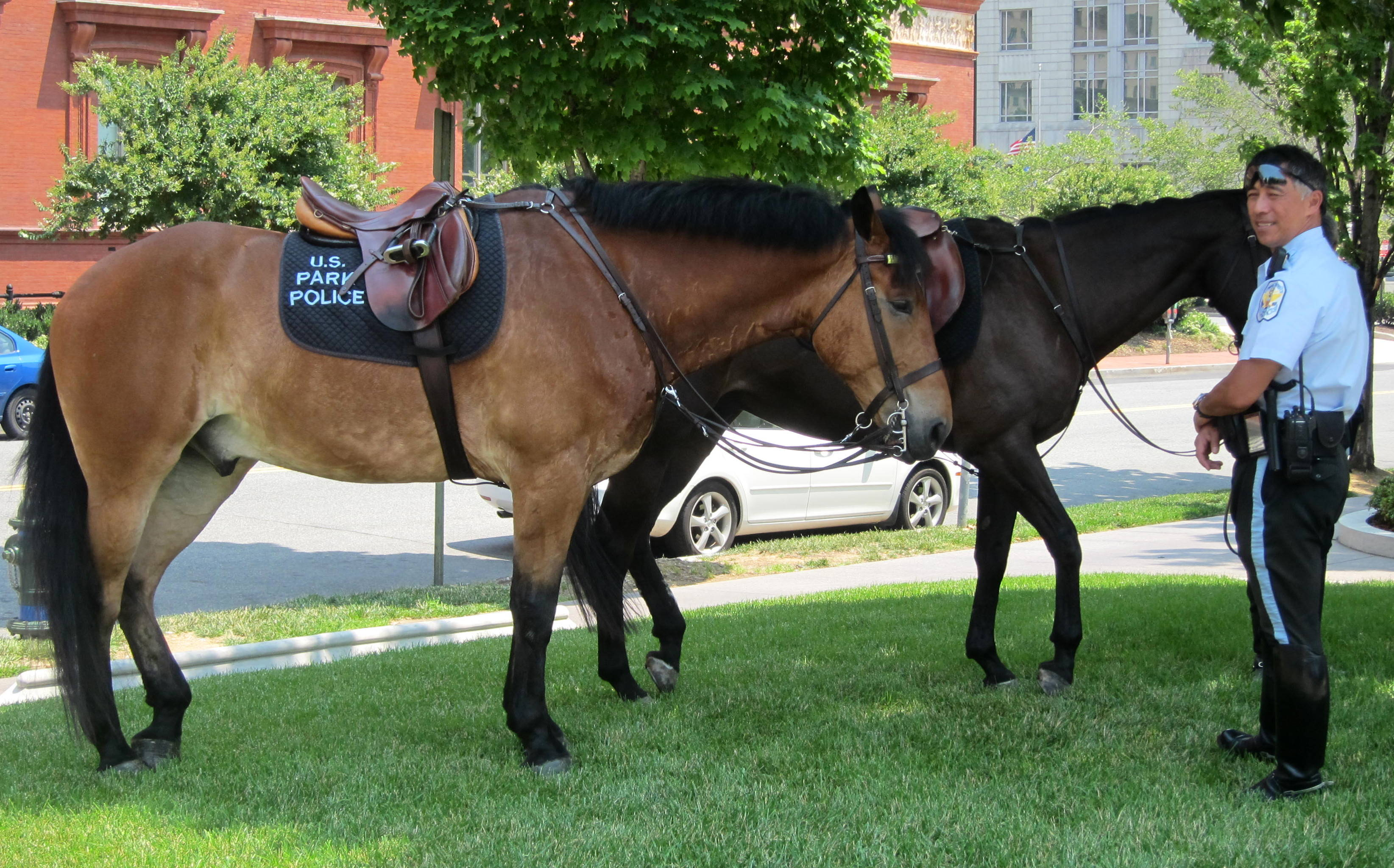
An officer from the U.S. Park Police Horse Mounted Unit

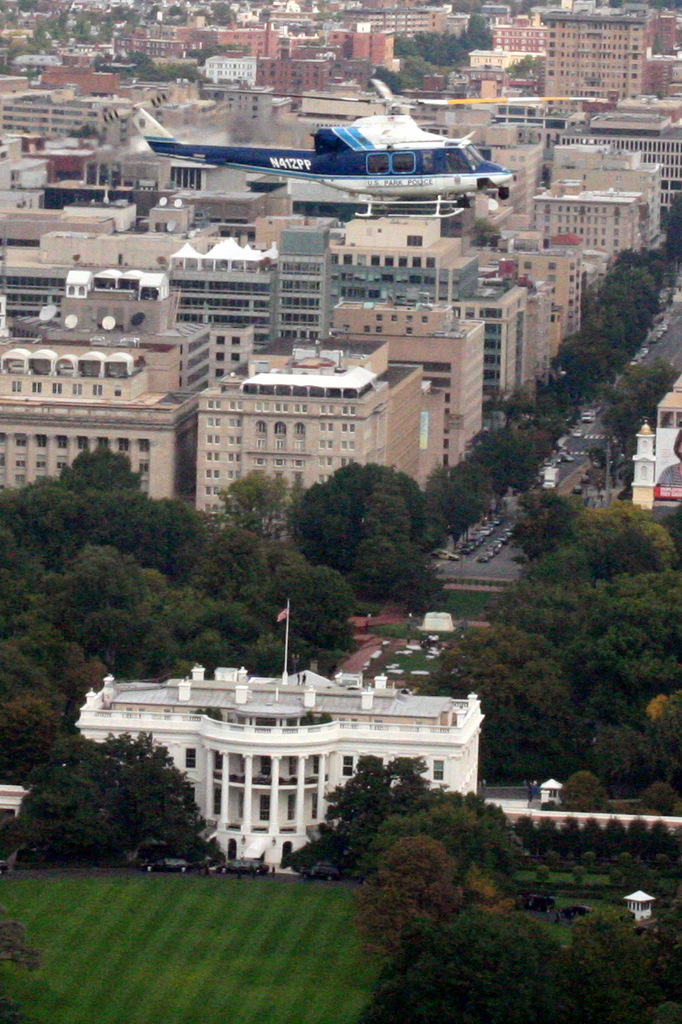
U.S. Park Police helicopter patrolling the National Mall

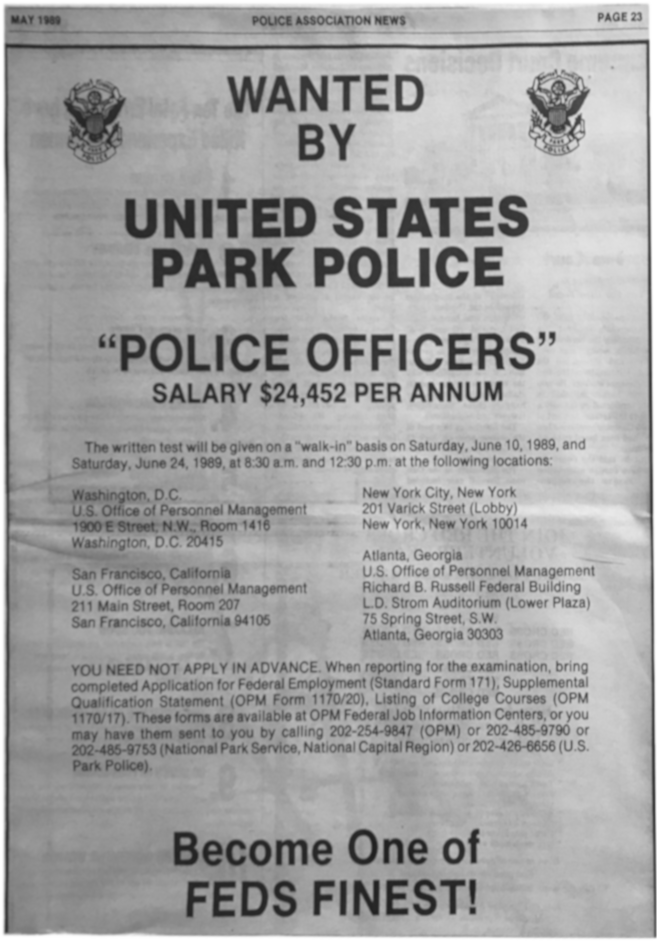
USPP recruiting advertisement from 1989

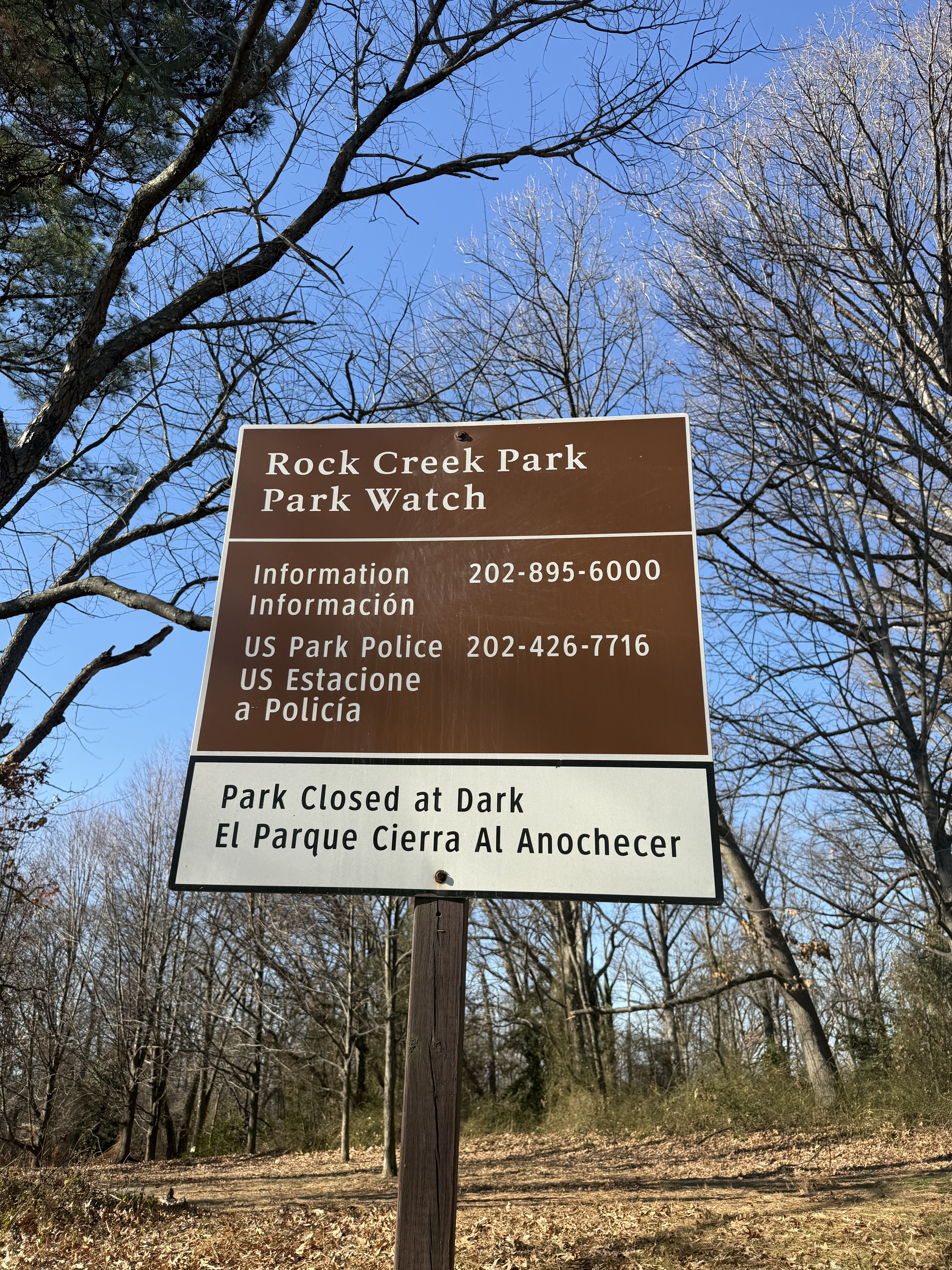
Typical USPP sign at NPS parkland around Washington, DC, includes the mistranslated name in Spanish as US Estacione a Policía.

== See also ==
- List of United States federal law enforcement agencies
- List of law enforcement agencies in the District of Columbia
- Park Police
