= Killing of Bijan Ghaisar =

2017 police shooting in Virginia, United States

- Date: November 17, 2017
- Location: George Washington Memorial Parkway, Alexandria, Virginia, and Fairfax County, Virginia; 38°44′49″N 77°03′28″W
- Filmed by: Fairfax Police
- Participants: US Park Police Officers Alejandro Amaya & Lucas Vinyard, Fairfax County Police, Bijan Ghaisar
- Deaths: Bijan Ghaisar

On November 17, 2017, Bijan C. Ghaisar, a 25-year-old American, was fatally shot by US Park Police officers Lucas Vinyard and Alejandro Amaya after a vehicular chase that followed a traffic collision along the George Washington Memorial Parkway in Northern Virginia. Ghaisar was unarmed and died ten days later in a hospital. A video of the shooting was released by Fairfax County Police, who had assisted with the chase.

The incident was investigated by the Federal Bureau of Investigation. In December 2019 Fairfax County prosecutors announced that they would seek an indictment for the killing that occurred in their jurisdiction but the assumption of a new prosecutor to that office resulted in further review. In October 2020, Vinyard and Amaya were charged with one count of manslaughter and one count of reckless discharge of a firearm. In court filings, they stated they acted in self defense.

== Persons involved ==
- Bijan C. Ghaisar was born at Inova Fairfax Hospital in 1992 to Iranian immigrants. After graduating from Langley High School and Virginia Commonwealth University, he worked for his father's accounting firm in Tysons Corner, Virginia. He was single with no children and had no criminal record. He had attended a Buddhist temple and made a Facebook post opposing guns.
- Alejandro Amaya is a US Park Police officer.
- Lucas Vinyard is a US Park Police officer.

== Shooting ==
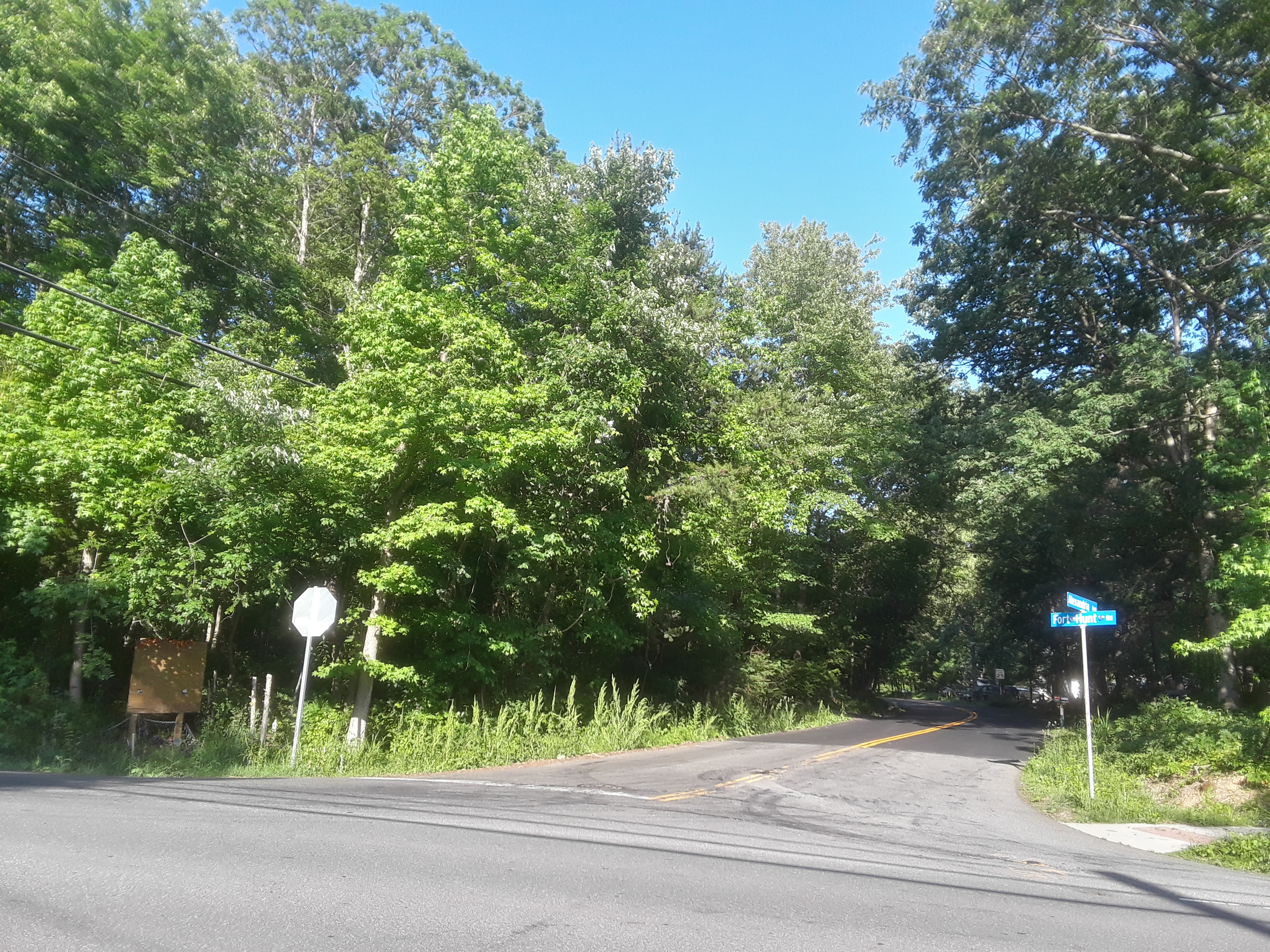
Site of the shooting, seen in May 2020; the wooden signboard on the left corner formerly held signage memorializing Ghaisar

Ghaisar was driving a Jeep Grand Cherokee southbound along the George Washington Memorial Parkway in Alexandria City to his parents' house for dinner. When he suddenly stopped in traffic he was rear-ended by an Uber driver in a Toyota Corolla with a female passenger in the back seat. The driver and the passenger both reported the incident to 911. According to a report of the accident, Ghaisar pulled away without giving his information to the Uber driver, an action that would have been a misdemeanor. A lookout for his vehicle was announced and a Park Police car followed in pursuit with Fairfax County Police assisting. The Park Police pulled Ghaisar over with Ghaisar stopping his vehicle. He was approached on foot by a Park Police officer with his gun drawn. As Ghaisar drove off the officer banged on the car with the butt of his gun, dropping his weapon. The pursuit continued at 57 miles per hour.

Ghaisar was stopped a third time in the Fort Hunt area. Park Police parked a vehicle in front of Ghaisar's Jeep to prevent him from fleeing again. As his vehicle slowly rolled away a few feet, Park Police fired ten shots in three different bursts. It was initially reported that there were nine shots fired, but after almost two years the FBI clarified that there were 10 shots. All four fatal shots were fired by the officer who was driving during the pursuit.

Following the shooting, Bijan Ghaisar was hospitalized for ten days in intensive care and he died ten hours after he was taken off a respirator on November 27, 2017.

== Aftermath ==
In January 2018, Fairfax Police released a five-minute video of the chase filmed from one of their vehicles. Fairfax police were involved in the chase but not in the investigation. The shooting was being investigated by the Federal Bureau of Investigation, which has not released any information about the case. The probe was being overseen by the Department of Justice. The FBI has refused to release any information about the case. Seven months after the shooting, FBI crime scene investigators returned to the intersection with agents using metal detectors to search for additional evidence.

The Ghaisar family organized protests to draw more attention to the slaying and to the fact that few details had been released.

Signs erected on the spot of the shooting have been taken down multiple times. After a sign that read "One year, zero answers" was removed twice, a larger and sturdier sign was constructed near the stop-sign where Ghaisar had been shot. This sign had permission from the landowner to be erected there and was built with the help of a Virginia state delegate. It was, however, also removed by persons unknown.

=== Park Police ===
The Park Police have limited jurisdiction in 5 states, including the Maryland and Virginia counties that surround Washington DC plus the city of Alexandria, Virginia, but have no authority to follow a vehicle outside their jurisdiction unless a felony has been committed. According to Park Police policy, lethal force can be used only when there is "imminent danger of death or serious bodily harm" and that "Officers shall not fire at a moving vehicle nor fire from a moving vehicle except when the officer has a reasonable belief that the subject poses an imminent danger of death or serious physical injury to the officer or to another person."

Park Police have provided almost no information about the incident. According to a lawsuit filed by the family, it was twelve hours following the incident before the family learned that Park Police were involved. Two days after the shooting, Park Police Chief Robert McLean met with the family. MacLean offered condolences but provided no information about what had happened.

The Ghaisar family was not allowed to touch their son for three days following the incident, when he was guarded by the department's officers. According to the family, when a doctor arrived to examine Ghaisar for organ donation, the Park Police denied access, declaring the brain-dead man "under arrest" and his body "evidence".

For 16 months, Park Police refused to identify the officers involved in the shooting. In response to a wrongful death lawsuit by the family, Park Police identified the shooters as officers Alejandro Amaya and Lucas Vinyard. Both officers were placed on paid administrative duty after the fatal shooting, and after their indictment in state court in October 2020, the officers were placed on paid leave. The Park Police had not launched an internal investigation into the matter, saying that it would not do so until the conclusion of the criminal case.

Recordings of the 911 calls fielded by Arlington's public safety communications center were transferred to the Park Police, who are keeping the calls and their recordings secret.

Sometime after the shooting, the Park Police changed their pursuit policies. The policies had remained largely unchanged since the late 1990s and the changes were made public in February 2020.

== Civil lawsuit ==
In August 2018, Ghaisar's parents filed a civil lawsuit in federal court, naming the United States as a defendant and seeking $25 million in damages. The parents alleged that the Park Police's pursuit and killing of Ghaisar was improper, and that the Park Police treated the family insensitively in the hours and days immediately after the shooting, including by failing to promptly inform the family, barring the parents from accessing and touching their mortally wounded son, and declaring the brain-dead Ghaisar "under arrest" and his body "evidence."

As part of the proceedings the two sides in the lawsuit filed a list of uncontested facts stating that Amaya and Vinyard have each been the subject of three separate complaints and investigations (dating from 2008 for Vinyard and 2013 for Amaya). The nature of the complaints or how the complaints were resolved was not disclosed. The stipulation of facts also states that on the night of the shooting marijuana and a pipe were found in Ghaisar's vehicle. In June 2019, the officers made a court appearance in the civil lawsuit and stated they acted in self defense. The officers invoked Fifth Amendment protection against self-incrimination. The officers sought to deny that they were federal agents operating under federal law, as police officers often have greater legal protection. In September 2020, the officers' lawyers in the Ghaisar family's civil suit released some documents from the two-year FBI investigation. These documents included Amaya and Vinyard's statements from that investigation and the information that Ghaisar's autopsy showed marijuana in his system.

In 2021, the civil suit was close to trial, but the proceedings were stayed by U.S. District Judge Claude Hilton pending the resolution of a parallel case involving the Park Police officers' claims of immunity from state prosecution. On April 21, 2023 a five million dollar settlement agreement was reached in federal court in Alexandria. The terms of the agreement must still be approved by a judge.

== Criminal investigations and prosecution ==
The U.S. Department of Justice (DOJ) investigated the incident for two years, but decided in November 2019 that it would not bring federal charges against the two U.S. Park Police officers, Alejandro Amaya and Lucas Vinyard.

State prosecutors in Fairfax County, Virginia, separately investigated, and in December 2019, Fairfax county prosecutors announced that they would seek an indictment for the two officers responsible for shooting Ghaisar and had tried to empanel a grand jury. Fairfax Commonwealth's Attorney Raymond F. Morrogh obtained documents from the FBI investigation in December 2019, although the FBI withheld about 260 documents from the prosecutor's office. Testimony was delayed as the FBI considered whether to allow its officers to testify. In February 2020, the DOJ announced that it would block the FBI agents who investigated the Ghaisar killing from testifying before a Fairfax County grand jury. Eric Dreiband, the head of the DOJ Civil Rights Division, said in a letter to Fairfax prosecutors that allowing the FBI agents to testify would create a conflict of interest if DOJ ultimately decided to defend the officers in the civil lawsuit, and also invoked the legal precedent that "a federal officer may not be prosecuted by a State for actions undertaken in the course of performing the officer's official duties" if the officer's actions are "objectively reasonable." Newly elected Fairfax prosecutor Steve Descano responded that his office's investigation would continue and that they "continue to request and expect the Department's future cooperation when necessary."

In October 2020, the two officers were indicted in Fairfax County Circuit Court by a special grand jury convened by Descano. The indictment charged the officers with manslaughter and reckless use of a firearm. The officers were booked in Fairfax County jail and later released on $10,000 bond. As part of Virginia's legal proceedings, radio conversations between police dispatch and the two officers were released in August 2021 which showed that Amaya and Vinyard were told by dispatch that Ghaisar's vehicle was not at-fault in the rear-end accident. Recordings of the communications were included in the 320-page expert witness report on the incident authored by City University of New York criminal justice professor Christopher Chapman for the prosecution.

The officers argued that the Supremacy Clause blocked their prosecution in state court, while Descano and Virginia Attorney General Mark R. Herring argued that the Supremacy Clause did not bar the indictment. Under the Supremacy Clause, federal agents are immune from prosecution in state court if their actions are "necessary and proper" and undertaken as part of official duties. In November 2020, the officers removed the case to federal court, specifically the U.S. District Court in Alexandria, Virginia. A hearing was held in August 2021 to consider whether the two officers are entitled to immunity. Vinyard and Amaya did not testify at the hearing. In October 2021, U.S. District Judge Claude Hilton dismissed all criminal charges against Vinyard and Amaya, ruling that the officers were entitled to immunity because under the circumstances, "The officers' decision to discharge their firearms was necessary and proper under the circumstances and there is no evidence that the officers acted with malice, criminal intent, or any improper motivation." The Virginia Attorney General's Office and the Fairfax County Commonwealth's Attorney are appealing the ruling to the U.S. Court of Appeals for the Fourth Circuit. On April 22, 2022, the Commonwealth withdrew its motion to appeal that ruling under the direction of the new Attorney General, Jason Miyares.

== Legislative and public response ==
In January 2018, the Washington, D.C. representative to the U.S. Congress, Democrat Eleanor Holmes Norton, introduced a bill to require uniformed federal police officers to wear body cameras and have dashboard cameras in marked vehicles. The legislation was directly in response to Ghaisar's death. Park Police Chief Robert MacLean backed out of a scheduled meeting with Holmes Norton to discuss the matter, prompting Holmes Norton to make a statement to "express our astonishment" at his absence".

Following the release of the video, U.S. Senators (both D-VA) Tim Kaine and Mark Warner, and U.S. Representative Don Beyer called on the FBI for more transparency. Beyer unsuccessfully requested a meeting with FBI Director Christopher A. Wray. Secretary of the Interior Ryan Zinke refused requests to release the names of the Park Police involved in the shooting.

In multiple letters to the FBI, Senator Charles Grassley (R-IA) requested information about the killing. Three months after his first letter, the FBI provided a short response that offered no new information and said the matter remained under investigation.

Following the FBI's November 2019 announcement that Vinyard and Amaya would not be charged for their actions, Beyer stated that the announcement was "not justice". Grassley and Warner also issued statements expressing disapproval. Holmes Norton, Beyer, and U.S. Representative Jennifer Wexton (D-VA), called for the release of 911 tapes related to the shooting. Norton said she believes that U.S. Park Police violated their department policies during the incident.

The National Iranian American Council released a statement asserting that the facts of the case "strongly suggests that the police's shooting was not justified or proportionate."

== See also ==
- List of killings by law enforcement officers in the United States
- List of killings by law enforcement officers in the United States, November 2017
