= List of killings by law enforcement officers in the United States, November 2017 =

This is a list of people reported killed by non-military law enforcement officers in the United States in November 2017, whether in the line of duty or not, and regardless of reason or method. The listing documents the occurrence of a death, making no implications regarding wrongdoing or justification on the part of the person killed or officer involved. Killings are arranged by date of the incident that caused death. Different death dates, if known, are noted in the description. The table below lists 96 people.

== November 2017 ==
Date	Name (age) of deceased	Race	State (city)	Description
2017-11-30	Juan Andres Barillas (37)	Hispanic	Los Angeles, CA	
2017-11-30	Clinton "Shane" Lee (27)	White	Cameron, MO	
2017-11-30	Jonathan Maldonado (21)	Hispanic	Hartsdale, NY	
2017-11-30	Aquoness Cathery (24)	Black	Chicago, IL	
2017-11-29	Name Withheld ()	Hispanic	Sells, AZ	
2017-11-28	Christopher "CJ" Escobedo (25)	Hispanic	Tieton, WA	
2017-11-28	James C. Danforth (59)	White	Spokane, WA	
2017-11-28	Lucas William Stone (30)	White	Reno, NV	
2017-11-28	Robert Claude Smith (64)	White	Eaton Rapids, MI	
2017-11-28	Isaiah Christian Green (21)		Pennsylvania (Dover Township)	"The 911 phone call that drew a Northern York County Regional Police officer to Isaiah Christian Green's home early Thursday morning was quick. Maybe just a brief sentence. What happened after the officer arrived is not entirely clear, as state police investigators continue to handle their investigation into the officer-involved shooting. What is known is that the officer fatally shot Green, 21, a former Dover football standout, who approached the officer with an AR-15 rifle."
2017-11-28	Christian Chavez (40)	Hispanic	California (South Gate)	"A suspect who was killed in a standoff with police has been identified as a 40-year-old South Gate man who had allegedly assaulted his live-in girlfriend with a handgun. Christian Chavez, 40, died in the standoff, during which he allegedly fired at officers. Police say on Sunday Chavez had hit his live-in girlfriend with a handgun, sending her to the hospital. He fled the area and South Gate officers obtained a warrant for his arrest Monday. Monday night, his girlfriend told police she believed Chavez was in the area. Officers found him around 7:35 p.m. inside his parked truck on the 2700 block of Illinois Avenue. He refused to leave the vehicle and a standoff situation developed. SWAT officers eventually arrived on scene and tried to use less lethal rounds and irritants to get the man out of the car. At one point, he was seen drinking and smoking while he tried to wait out authorities. The irritants that were thrown into his vehicle did not appear to faze him. Surrounding homes in the neighborhood were evacuated as authorities tried to get the man to surrender peacefully. Toward the end of the standoff, the suspect opened fire and shot several rounds at officers through his passenger side window.."
2017-11-28	Kenneth Perna-Rutsky (38)		Virginia (Chester)	"A man who exchanged gunfire with police in Chester on Wednesday was found dead inside a home, authorities said. Chesterfield police later identified the man as Kenneth J. Perna-Rutsky, 38. Officers had responded about 10:34 a.m. to the 300 block of Sunset Boulevard for a report of a man who had barricaded himself in a house, said police Lt. Peter Cimbal. There were reports that shots had been fired, but not at anyone. But Cimbal said that when police approached the residence, the man fired at the officers. The police returned fire and the man retreated into the home."
2017-11-27	Bijan C. Ghaisar (25)	Asian	Virginia (Fairfax County)	Bijan Ghaisar, a 25 year old accountant from McLean, Va., died on November 27th, ten days after being shot at nine times by U.S. Park Police. Five bullets hit Ghaisar, one in his wrist and four in his head. As of May 22, 2018, no details of the FBI investigation into Ghaisar's death have been released to the public, including the names of the US Park police officers who were involved in the shooting.
2017-11-27	Jacob L. Baumgart (15)	Hispanic	Richmond, VA	
2017-11-26	Ronald O. Hunt (58)	White	Lenexa, KS	
2017-11-26	Daniel Navarro (22)	Hispanic	Covina, CA	
2017-11-26	Juan Luis Castro (43)	Hispanic	Hanford, CA	
2017-11-26	William Freddy Carter Jr. (31)	White	Huntsville, AL	
2017-11-25	Name Withheld (26)	Black	Detroit, MI	
2017-11-25	Nelson Rodarte (39)	Hispanic	Penasco, NM	
2017-11-24	Emilio John Cruz Hernandez (26)	Hispanic	Klamath Falls, OR	
2017-11-24	Rocky Miles West (28)	White	Wimberley, TX	
2017-11-24	Steve Steenhard (51)	White	Yuma, AZ	
2017-11-23	Nikolas Wanner (32)	White	Falcon, MO	
2017-11-23	Rehyen Bost-McMurray (17)	Black	St. Louis, MO	
2017-11-23	Jackie Germaine Ragland (32)	Black	Pell City, AL	
2017-11-20	Seth William Johnson (15)	White	Gulfport, MS	
2017-11-19	Geronimo Vicente Santos aka Carlos Aguirrez-Justo (34)	Hispanic	Lompoc, CA	
2017-11-19	Jacob Paul McCarty (27)	White	Greenville, SC	
2017-11-19	Matthew Donald Tobin (26)	White	Davenport, IA	
2017-11-18	Brian Calvert (18)	White	Woodburn, KY	
2017-11-18	Preston David Bell (24)	Native American	Billings, MT	
2017-11-18	Lawrence Hawkins (56)	Black	Prichard, AL	
2017-11-17	Martin Jim (25)	White	Albuquerque, NM	
2017-11-17	Shady Bell Jr. (46)	Black	West Monroe, LA	
2017-11-17	Isaac Padilla (23)	Hispanic	Albuquerque, NM	
2017-11-16	Seth Hardwick (30)	White	Charleston, WV	
2017-11-16	Chester Randolph Ward (68)	Black	Brazoria, TX	
2017-11-16	Michael Wesley Goodale (34)	White	Chiefland, FL	
2017-11-16	Name Withheld	Unknown race	Hedgesville, WV	
2017-11-16	Jose Luis Hernandez (7)	Hispanic	Boyle Heights, CA	
2017-11-16	Marcos Hernandez (9)	Hispanic	Boyle Heights, CA	
2017-11-15	Thomas Barclay (48)	White	Anchorage, AK	
2017-11-15	Phillip Vancise (59)	White	Elmira, NY	
2017-11-15	Oscar Anaya (22)	Hispanic	Los Angeles, CA	
2017-11-15	Nathaniel Fleming	Black	Jackson, MS	
2017-11-15	Dustin Robert Pigeon (29)	Native American	Oklahoma City, OK	
2017-11-14	Adam Brogdon (23)	Hispanic	Phoenix, AZ	
2017-11-14	Keian Jones (51)	Black	Stockton, CA	
2017-11-14	Kevin Janson Neal (44)		California (Corning)	In the Rancho Tehama shootings, gunman Kevin Janson Neal killed five people and injured eighteen others at eight separate crime scenes, including an elementary school. Ten people were injured by bullet wounds and eight were injured by flying glass caused by the gunfire. Neal was shot and killed by sheriff's deputies while being chased in a stolen vehicle.
2017-11-13	Cornell Lockhart (67)	Black	Bronx, NY	
2017-11-13	Calvin Toney (24)	Black	Baton Rouge, LA	
2017-11-12	Larry Ruiz-Barreto (19)	Hispanic	Massachusetts (Fall River)	A 19-year-old New Bedford man was shot and killed by a Fall River police officer late Sunday night, a shooting that took place as the victim allegedly tried to drive away from police who had been called to investigate a "smoking" car and reports of gunshots.
2017-11-11	Eddy Longoria (55)	White	Pearl River, LA	
2017-11-11	Phillip Pitts (41)	Black	Las Vegas, NV	
2017-11-11	Shane Allen Jensen (19)	White	Dakota City, IA	
2017-11-10	Matthew Joseph Scudero (50)	White	Albuquerque, NM	
2017-11-10	Thomas Aikens (43)	Black	Phoenix, AZ	
2017-11-10	John Todd Bazemore III (25)	Black	Denver, CO	
2017-11-10	Name Withheld ()	Black	Edwards, MS	
2017-11-10	Kerry Dean Hughes (53)	White	Littleton, CO	
2017-11-10	Terry A. Dubois Jr. (55)	White	Gibson, LA	
2017-11-10	Ronald L. Klitzka (62)	White	Crystal, MN	
2017-11-09	Paul Jones III (25)	Black	Salisbury, NC	
2017-11-09	Joseph J. Santos (32)	White	Providence, RI	
2017-11-09	Kiser Sturgell (27)	White	Flatwoods, KY	
2017-11-09	Charles Edwin "P.J." Nickels aka Charles Nichols (35)	White	Burnside, MS	
2017-11-09	Ashley Jenkins (23)	White	Flatwoods, KY	
2017-11-08	Roger Raymond York Jr. (32)	White	Clinton, TN	
2017-11-08	Jason Ike Pero (14)	Native American	Ashland, WI	
2017-11-08	James Jacob Bailey (30)	White	Forest Park, GA	
2017-11-08	Victor Bray (31)	White	Roanoke, VA	
2017-11-07	Talathia Brooks (32)	White	Marietta, GA	
2017-11-07	Jarrett Blakely Varnado (35)	Black	Las Vegas, NV	
2017-11-06	Pamela Webber (54)	White	Lynchburg, VA	
2017-11-06	Dana Dean Carrothers (52)	White	Lindsay, OK	
2017-11-06	Jeffrey Todd Sprowl (48)	White	Barstow, CA	
2017-11-05	Eddie Patterson (49)	Black	Rockford, IL	
2017-11-05	Name Withheld ()	White	Meridian, MS	
2017-11-05	Marlysa Sanchez (31)	Hispanic	Ruidoso, NM	
2017-11-04	Raymond Davis (24)	Black	Columbus, MS	
2017-11-04	Frank Joey Half Jr. (30)	Native American	Billings, MT	
2017-11-04	Nyung Kyee (56)	Asian	Clarksville, AR	
2017-11-04	Augustus Crawford (20)	Black	Bakersfield, CA	
2017-11-04	Humberto Edwards (27)	Unknown race	Phoenix, AZ	
2017-11-04	Michael Wayne Marin (35)	White	Parker, CO	
2017-11-03	Christopher Edward Loftis (39)	White	Ohatchee, AL	
2017-11-03	Marvin Stair (44)	Unknown race	Batesville, AR	
2017-11-03	Jorge Hidalgo (43)	Hispanic	El Paso, TX	
2017-11-03	Robert A. Powell (53)	White	Port Orange, FL	
2017-11-02	Jerry Roach (71)	White	Lakeland, FL	
2017-11-02	Mason Johnson II (31)	White	Spencer, IN	
2017-11-02	Wallace Jory (56)	White	North Highlands, CA	
2017-11-02	unknown	Unknown	Michigan (Inkster)	A man that matched the description of a suspect involved in a shooting fired shots at responding officers. The man was killed by return fire.
2017-11-01	Christopher Jacobs (28)	White	Kentucky (Pippa Passes)	A state trooper and a sheriff's deputy, who are brothers, attempted to arrest Jacobs for manufacturing meth. After crawling under a mobile home, Jacobs attempted to flee in his car. After the car rammed a police cruiser, the trooper shot Jacobs three times. Jacobs and the trooper had reportedly grown up together, and the trooper had once saved him from a drug overdose.
2017-11-01	Jamee Almarez (27)	White	Anniston, AL	
