= Beatrice V. Ball =

American military officer and police officer

- Born: December 2, 1902; Garden Valley, Idaho, U.S.
- Died: October 21, 1963 (aged 60); Baltimore, Maryland, U.S.
- Burial place: Arlington National Cemetery
- Education: Northwestern Oklahoma State University; Columbus School of Law; University of Denver
- Military career
- Allegiance: United States
- Branch: United States Navy; United States Coast Guard
- Service years: 1942–1946; 1951–1961
- Rank: Commander
- Nickname: Billy
- Unit: SPARS
- Conflicts: World War II; Korean War

Beatrice Vivian Ball (December 2, 1902 – October 21, 1963) was an American educator, police officer, lawyer, and military officer who served during World War II and the Korean War. Ball was the first woman to join the United States Park Police on January 1, 1942.

== Early life and education ==
Beatrice Vivian Ball was born on December 2, 1902, in Garden Valley, Idaho, to James Ball and Catherine Ball (née: Scanlon). At a young age Ball and her family moved to Vici, Oklahoma where she graduated from high school in 1922. Ball attended Northwestern Oklahoma State University (Northwestern State Teachers College) in Alva, Oklahoma where she graduated with a Bachelor of Science in social studies in 1929.

In 1930 following a brief teaching and coaching career in Colorado, Ball returned to the Northwestern State Teachers College to pursue a degree in journalism although she did not complete this degree, during this time Ball worked for the Alva Review-Courier. In 1949 Ball earned a Bachelor of Fine Arts from the University of Denver.

== Career ==
=== Teaching ===
While studying at the Northwestern State Teachers College Ball taught seventh grade students and served as the basketball coach for the local school in Vici. Ball later taught and coached in both Wiley, Colorado, and Grand Valley, Colorado. Beginning in 1929 Ball worked for the Young Women's Christian Association (YWCA) as a secretary and continued to coach basketball.

=== Law enforcement ===
Beginning in August, 1931 Ball began a career as a law enforcement officer working for the Metropolitan Police Department of the District of Columbia's Women's Bureau. While working for the MPDC Ball earned a law degree from the Columbus School of Law in 1939. Ball would ultimately work for the MPDC for a total of 10 years. Ball later served with the United States Park Police beginning on January 1, 1942, she was the first woman hired as an officer for the USPP.

=== Military Service ===
During World War II Ball resigned from the USPP and initially joined the WAVES, the women's branch of the United States Navy; she was later transferred to serve in the first intake of the SPARS, the women's branch of the United States Coast Guard Reserve. Ball was commissioned as a Lieutenant on December 16, 1942, and was assigned to military intelligence in New York City and Miami from 1943 to 1944. According to The Washington Star and the National Park Service, Ball was the first female SPARS officer to serve in an intelligence role. Ball was later assigned to Ketchikan, Alaska in 1945; she retired from active duty in May, 1946.

Ball was recalled to active duty in September, 1951 during the Korean War where she served as the assistant to the Chief of the Special Services Division of the Coast Guard. Ball retired from the Coast Guard on May 24, 1961, with the rank of Commander.

== Death ==
Ball died on October 21, 1963, at the age of 60 in Baltimore from cancer. She is buried in Arlington National Cemetery.
