= Garden Valley, Idaho =

Area in Boise County, Idaho, United States of America

Coordinates: 44°05′24″N 115°57′50″W

- Unincorporated Community; Census Designated Place
- Location of Garden Valley in Contra Boise County, Idaho
- Country: United States
- State: Idaho
- County: Boise County

Population (2020)
  - Total: 377
- Time zone: UTC-7 (MST)
  - Summer (DST): UTC-6 (MDT)
- ZIP Code: 83622
- Area codes: 462, 923

Garden Valley is an unincorporated census-designated place in Boise County, Idaho, United States. As of the 2020 census, its population was 377, a decrease of the 394 count on the 2010 census. The mountain setting and recreation opportunities attract visitors from the Boise area. Life there during the pioneer days was quite harsh and economic opportunity was based on logging, mining, and ranching. In later years there was work as hunting guides.

== History ==
During the mid-1800s, the area became a hub for miners and homesteaders. Garden Valley's population was 25 in 1909, and was 10 in 1960.

== Geography ==
Garden Valley has an area of 7.632 square miles (19.77 km^{2}); 7.397 square miles (19.16 km^{2}) of this is land, and 0.235 square miles (0.61 km^{2}) is water.

== Climate ==
According to the Köppen climate classification system, Garden Valley has a warm-summer mediterranean climate, abbreviated "Csb" on climate maps. The hottest temperature recorded in Garden Valley was 110 °F (43.3 °C) on July 28, 1934, and August 3–4, 1961, while the coldest temperature recorded was −32 °F (−35.6 °C) on January 21, 1937.

Climate data for Garden Valley, Idaho, 1991–2020 normals, extremes 1893–2020
Month	Jan	Feb	Mar	Apr	May	Jun	Jul	Aug	Sep	Oct	Nov	Dec	Year
Record high °F (°C)	54 (12)	67 (19)	79 (26)	92 (33)	99 (37)	108 (42)	110 (43)	110 (43)	108 (42)	92 (33)	77 (25)	59 (15)	110 (43)
Mean maximum °F (°C)	44.8 (7.1)	52.4 (11.3)	67.1 (19.5)	77.4 (25.2)	86.0 (30.0)	93.4 (34.1)	100.2 (37.9)	98.8 (37.1)	93.8 (34.3)	81.3 (27.4)	58.8 (14.9)	46.1 (7.8)	101.0 (38.3)
Mean daily maximum °F (°C)	33.7 (0.9)	40.9 (4.9)	51.6 (10.9)	60.3 (15.7)	69.4 (20.8)	78.0 (25.6)	89.0 (31.7)	88.8 (31.6)	79.2 (26.2)	63.5 (17.5)	43.8 (6.6)	33.3 (0.7)	61.0 (16.1)
Daily mean °F (°C)	26.5 (−3.1)	31.2 (−0.4)	39.5 (4.2)	46.2 (7.9)	53.8 (12.1)	60.8 (16.0)	68.4 (20.2)	67.1 (19.5)	58.9 (14.9)	47.5 (8.6)	34.8 (1.6)	26.5 (−3.1)	46.8 (8.2)
Mean daily minimum °F (°C)	19.3 (−7.1)	21.6 (−5.8)	27.4 (−2.6)	32.1 (0.1)	38.2 (3.4)	43.6 (6.4)	47.7 (8.7)	45.5 (7.5)	38.6 (3.7)	31.4 (−0.3)	25.8 (−3.4)	19.8 (−6.8)	32.6 (0.3)
Mean minimum °F (°C)	−3.6 (−19.8)	3.3 (−15.9)	13.2 (−10.4)	21.6 (−5.8)	25.3 (−3.7)	32.6 (0.3)	38.0 (3.3)	35.2 (1.8)	27.1 (−2.7)	18.8 (−7.3)	10.3 (−12.1)	−0.6 (−18.1)	−8.4 (−22.4)
Record low °F (°C)	−32 (−36)	−27 (−33)	−7 (−22)	11 (−12)	17 (−8)	21 (−6)	28 (−2)	26 (−3)	12 (−11)	5 (−15)	−13 (−25)	−24 (−31)	−32 (−36)
Average precipitation inches (mm)	4.22 (107)	2.53 (64)	2.91 (74)	2.13 (54)	1.79 (45)	1.35 (34)	0.42 (11)	0.46 (12)	0.85 (22)	1.73 (44)	3.20 (81)	4.96 (126)	26.55 (674)
Average snowfall inches (cm)	22.8 (58)	10.2 (26)	3.5 (8.9)	0.4 (1.0)	0.0 (0.0)	0.0 (0.0)	0.0 (0.0)	0.0 (0.0)	0.0 (0.0)	0.3 (0.76)	8.0 (20)	24.2 (61)	69.4 (175.66)
Average precipitation days (≥ 0.01 in)	11.9	10.5	10.6	9.8	9.2	6.7	2.7	2.4	4.0	6.9	10.6	12.8	98.1
Average snowy days (≥ 0.1 in)	7.5	3.8	1.5	0.3	0.0	0.0	0.0	0.0	0.0	0.2	2.9	8.0	24.2
Source 1: NOAA
Source 2: National Weather Service

== Demographics ==
Historical population
Census	Pop.	Note	%±
2020	377		—
U.S. Decennial Census

== Notable people ==
- James Castle, artist, was a native of Garden Valley.
- Paul Revere Dick, founder of rock group Paul Revere & the Raiders.
- Beatrice V. Ball, first woman to join the US Park Police
