= James Charles Castle =

American artist (1899–1977)

James Castle (September 25, 1899 – October 26, 1977) was an American artist born in Garden Valley, Idaho. Although Castle did not know about the art world outside of his small community, his work ran parallel to the development of 20th-century art history. His works have been collected by major institutions. The Philadelphia Museum of Art organized a retrospective of Castle's work which toured nationally in 2008–09. Castle's work entered the international arena with a substantial exhibition in Madrid, Spain at the Museo Nacional Centro de Arte Reina Sofía in 2011 and was included in the 2013 Venice Biennale exhibition The Encyclopedic Palace. In 2014 The Smithsonian American Art Museum featured their recent acquisition in the exhibition Untitled: The Art of James Castle and the Whitney Museum of American Art included their acquired collection of Castle's work in the 2017 exhibition Where We Are.

== Biography ==
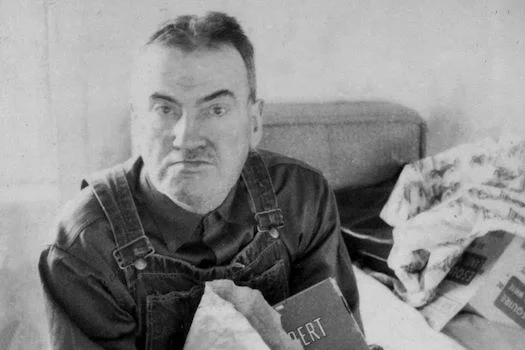
James Castle seated in his studio in Boise, Idaho

James Castle was a self-taught artist who created drawings, assemblage and books throughout his lifetime. Castle was born profoundly deaf and for at least some time attended the Gooding School for the Deaf and the Blind in Gooding, Idaho, but it is not known to what extent he could read, write, or use sign language. Castle's artworks were created almost exclusively with found materials such as papers salvaged from common packaging and mail, in addition to food containers of all types. Castle mixed ink using soot from the woodstove with saliva and applied it with tools of his own making, including sharpened sticks, and other found objects. His drawings sensitively depict interiors, buildings, animals, landscapes and people based on his family's rural Garden Valley homestead as well as the architecture and landscapes of the places he lived and visited. His former home in Boise, Idaho is now a cultural center devoted to his work and includes an artist-in-residence venue.

== Books and articles ==
- James Castle Memory Palace, John Beardsley, Yale University Press and James Castle Collection and Archive (2021)
- The James Castle Primer, Nicholas R. Bell, James Castle Collection and Archive (2018)
- Outliers and American Vanguard Art, Lynne Cooke, National Gallery of Art (2018)
- James Castle: The Experience of Everyday, Dennis Michael Jon, Minneapolis Institute of Art (2016)
- Untitled: The Art of James Castle, Nicholas Bell and Leslie Umberger, with D. Giles Ltd., London (2014)
- The Encyclopedic Palace, Massimiliano Gioni and Natalie Bell, Fondazione La Biennale di Venezia, Venice (2013) 309.
- Shock of the News, Judith Brodie, Lund Humphries, (2012), 65.
- Rosemarie Trockel: A Cosmos, Edited by Lynne Cooke, Museo Nacional Centro de Arte Reina Sofia, Madrid (2012) 96–99.
- James Castle, Galerie Karsten Greve, Cologne, Germany (2011)
- James Castle: Show and Store, Edited by Lynne Cooke, Museo Nacional Centro de Arte Reina Sofia, Madrid (2011)
- James Castle, The Douglas Hyde Gallery, Dublin, Ireland (2010)
- James Castle: A Retrospective, Edited by Ann Percy, Yale University Press (2009)
- James Castle: A Retrospective, by Lynne Cooke, Artforum (December 2009) 168–171.
- Touched into Being by Stephen Westfall, Art in America, New York, (June 2001) 5–16.
- American Anthem: Masterworks from the American Folk Art Museum, by Stacy C. Hollander and Brooke Davis Anderson, American Folk Art Museum in association with Henry N. Abrams, Inc., New York, (2001)
- Twentieth Century American Folk Art and Artists, by Herbert W. Hemphill, Jr. and Julia Weissman, E.P. Dutton & Co., Inc., New York (1974) 170.

== Collections ==
James Castle's works are in the collections of the following institutions:

- American Folk Art Museum, New York, New York
- Art Institute of Chicago, Illinois
- Berkeley Art Museum and Pacific Film Archive, Berkeley, California
- Boise Art Museum, Boise, Idaho
- Columbus Museum of Art, Columbus, Ohio
- Glenstone, Potomac, Maryland
- Hallie Ford Museum of Art, Willamette University, Salem, Oregon
- Henry Art Gallery, University of Washington, Seattle, Washington
- High Museum of Art, Atlanta, Georgia
- Mennello Museum of American Art, Orlando, Florida
- Milwaukee Art Museum, Milwaukee, Wisconsin
- Minneapolis Institute of Art
- Museo Nacional Centro de Arte Reina Sofía, Madrid, Spain
- Museum of Modern Art, New York, New York
- National Gallery of Art, Washington, District of Columbia
- New York Public Library, New York, New York
- Philadelphia Museum of Art, Philadelphia, Pennsylvania
- Portland Art Museum, Portland, Oregon
- Smithsonian American Art Museum, Washington, District of Columbia
- Tacoma Art Museum, Tacoma, Washington
- Whitney Museum of American Art, New York, New York
- Yale University Art Gallery, New Haven, CT
