= Anti-nuclear movement =

Movement opposing nuclear energy and weapons due to environmental and safety concerns

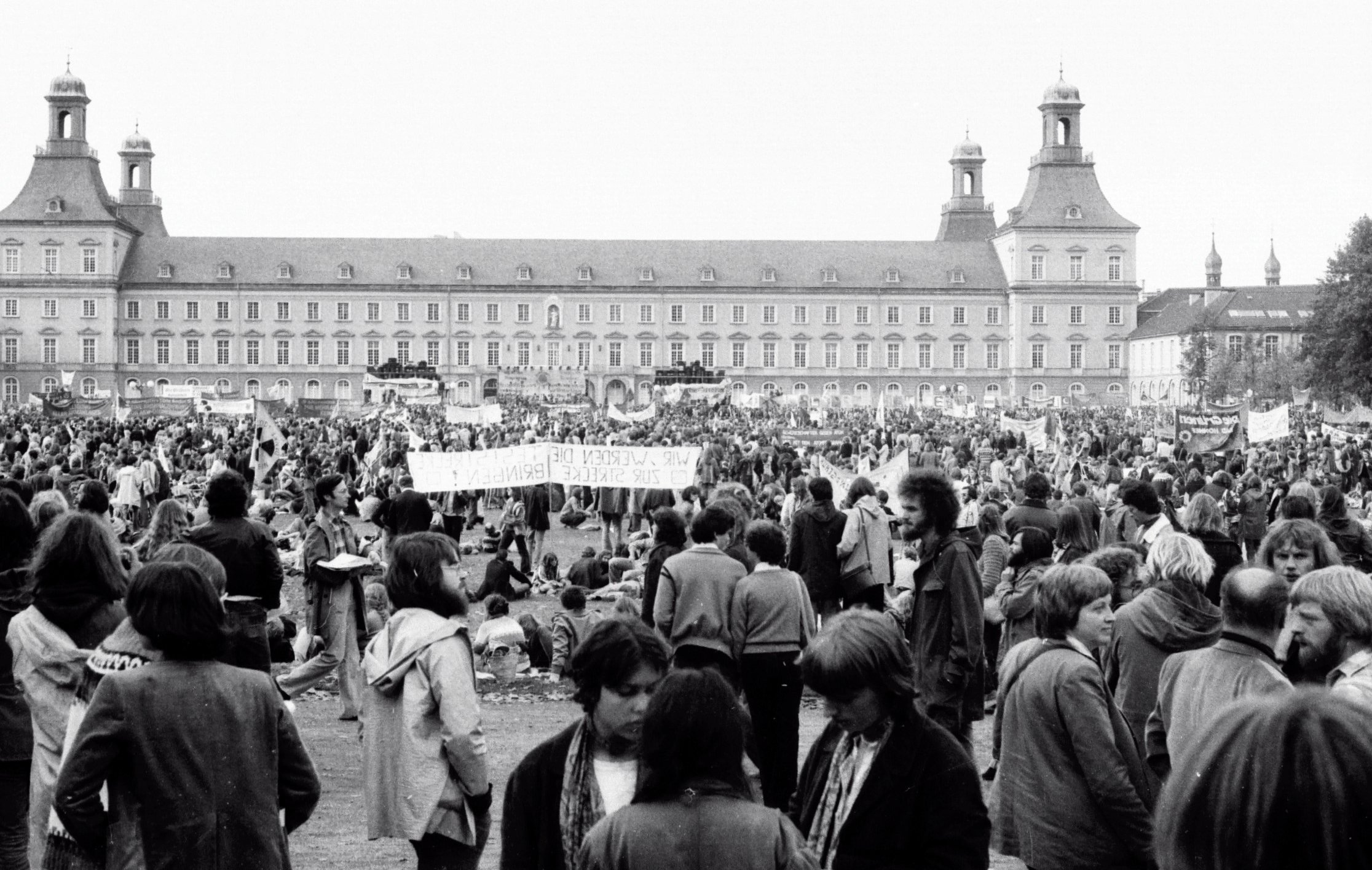
169,000 people attended an anti-nuclear protest in Bonn, West Germany, on 14 October 1979, following the Three Mile Island accident.

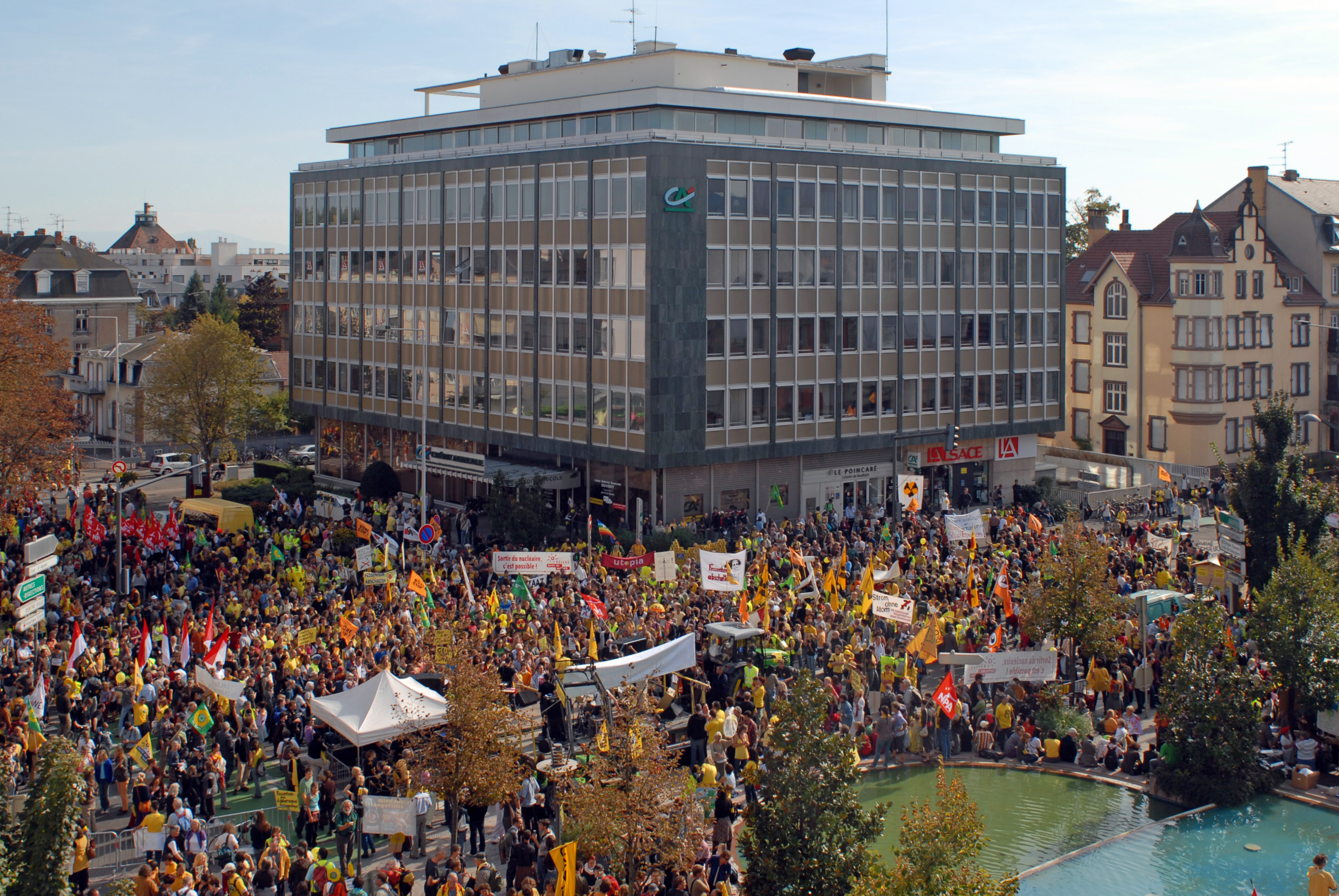
Anti-nuclear demonstration in Colmar, northeastern France, on 3 October 2009

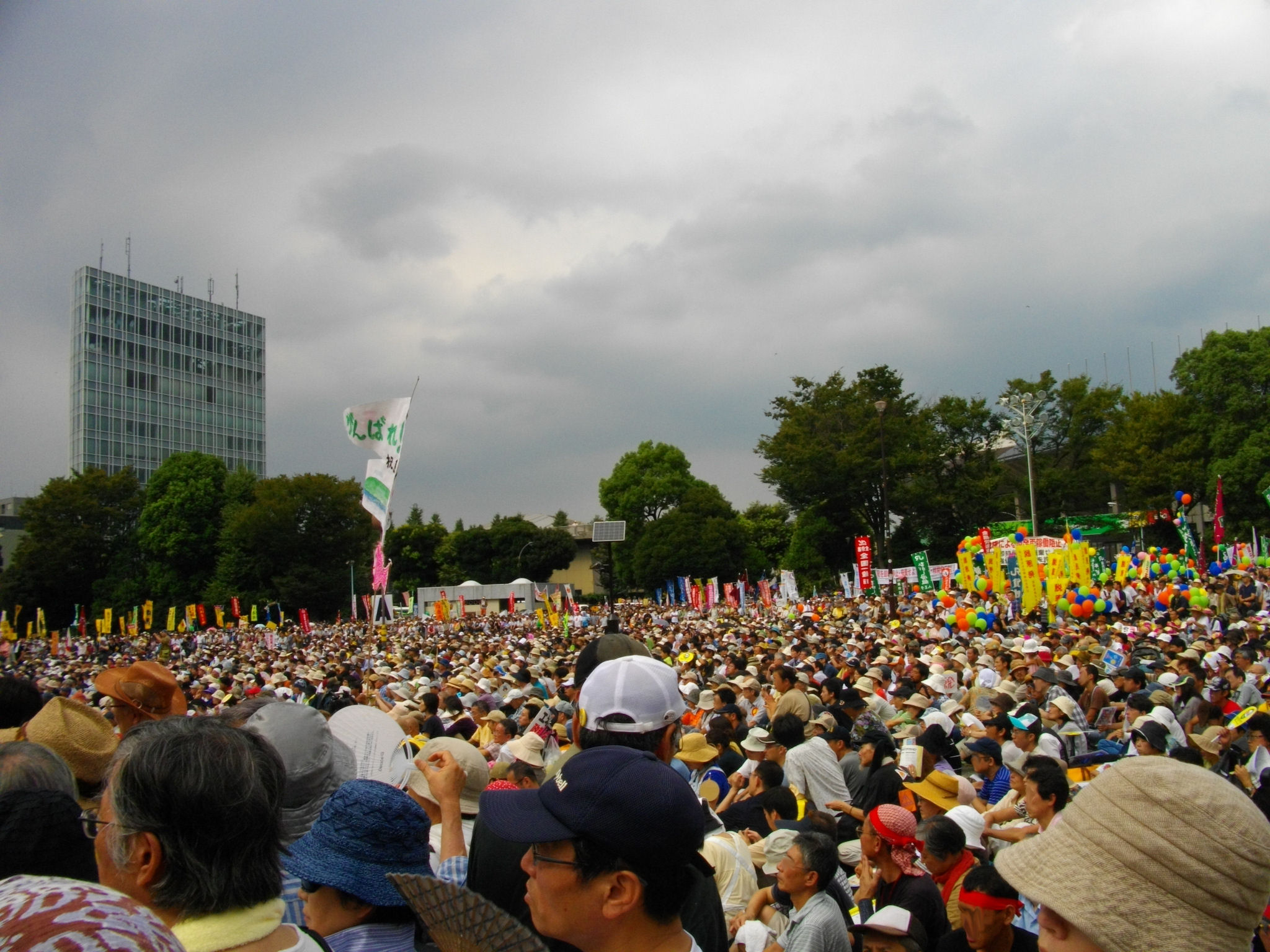
Anti-nuclear power plant Rally following the Fukushima Daiichi nuclear disaster on 19 September 2011, at Meiji Shrine complex in Tokyo, Japan

The anti-nuclear movement is a social movement that opposes various nuclear technologies. Some direct action groups, environmental movements, and professional organisations have identified themselves with the movement at the local, national, or international level. Major anti-nuclear groups include Campaign for Nuclear Disarmament, Friends of the Earth, Greenpeace, International Physicians for the Prevention of Nuclear War, Peace Action, Seneca Women's Encampment for a Future of Peace and Justice and the Nuclear Information and Resource Service. The movement's initial objective was nuclear disarmament, though since the late 1960s, opposition has also included the use of nuclear power. Many anti-nuclear groups oppose both nuclear power and nuclear weapons. The formation of green parties in the 1970s and 1980s was often a direct result of anti-nuclear politics.

Scientists and diplomats have debated nuclear weapons policy since before the atomic bombings of Hiroshima and Nagasaki in 1945. The public became concerned about nuclear weapons testing from about 1954, following extensive nuclear testing, including the Castle Bravo disaster. In 1963, many countries ratified the Partial Test Ban Treaty, which prohibited atmospheric nuclear testing.

Some local opposition to nuclear power emerged in the early 1960s. In the late 1960s some members of the scientific community began to express their concerns. In the early 1970s, there were large protests about the proposed Wyhl Nuclear Power Plant, in southern Germany. The project was cancelled in 1975, and anti-nuclear success at Wyhl inspired opposition to nuclear power in other parts of Europe and North America. Nuclear power became an issue of major public protest in the 1970s and while opposition to nuclear power continues, increasing public support for nuclear power has re-emerged over the last decade in light of growing awareness of global warming and renewed interest in all types of clean energy (see the Pro-nuclear movement).

A protest against nuclear power occurred in July 1977 in Bilbao, Spain, with up to 200,000 people in attendance. Following the Three Mile Island accident in 1979, an anti-nuclear protest was held in New York City, involving 200,000 people. In 1981, Germany's largest anti-nuclear power demonstration took place to protest against the Brokdorf Nuclear Power Plant west of Hamburg; some 100,000 people came face to face with 10,000 police officers. The largest protest was held on 12 June 1982, when one million people demonstrated in New York City against nuclear weapons. A 1983 nuclear weapons protest in West Berlin had about 600,000 participants. In May 1986, following the Chernobyl disaster, an estimated 150,000 to 200,000 people marched in Rome to protest against the Italian nuclear program. In Australia, unions, peace activists, and environmentalists opposed uranium mining from the 1970s onwards, and rallies bringing together hundreds of thousands of people to oppose nuclear weapons peaked in the mid- 1980s. In the US, public opposition preceded the shutdown of the Shoreham, Yankee Rowe, Millstone 1, Rancho Seco, Maine Yankee, and many other nuclear power plants.

For many years after the 1986 Chernobyl disaster, nuclear power was off the policy agenda in most countries, and the anti-nuclear power movement seemed to have won its case, so some anti-nuclear groups disbanded. In the 2000s, however, following public relations activities by the nuclear industry, advances in nuclear reactor designs, and concerns about climate change, nuclear power issues came back into energy policy discussions in some countries. The 2011 Fukushima nuclear accident subsequently undermined the nuclear power industry's proposed renaissance and revived opposition to nuclear power worldwide, putting governments on the defensive. As of 2016, countries such as Australia, Austria, Denmark, Greece, Malaysia, New Zealand, and Norway have no nuclear power stations and remain opposed to nuclear power. Germany, Italy, Spain, and Switzerland are phasing-out nuclear power. Sweden formerly had a nuclear phase-out policy, aiming to end nuclear power generation in Sweden by 2010. On 5 February 2009, the Government of Sweden announced an agreement allowing for the replacement of existing reactors, effectively ending the phase-out policy. Globally, the number of operable reactors has remained nearly the same over the last 30 years, and nuclear electricity production has been steadily growing since the Fukushima disaster.

== History and issues ==
=== Roots of the movement ===
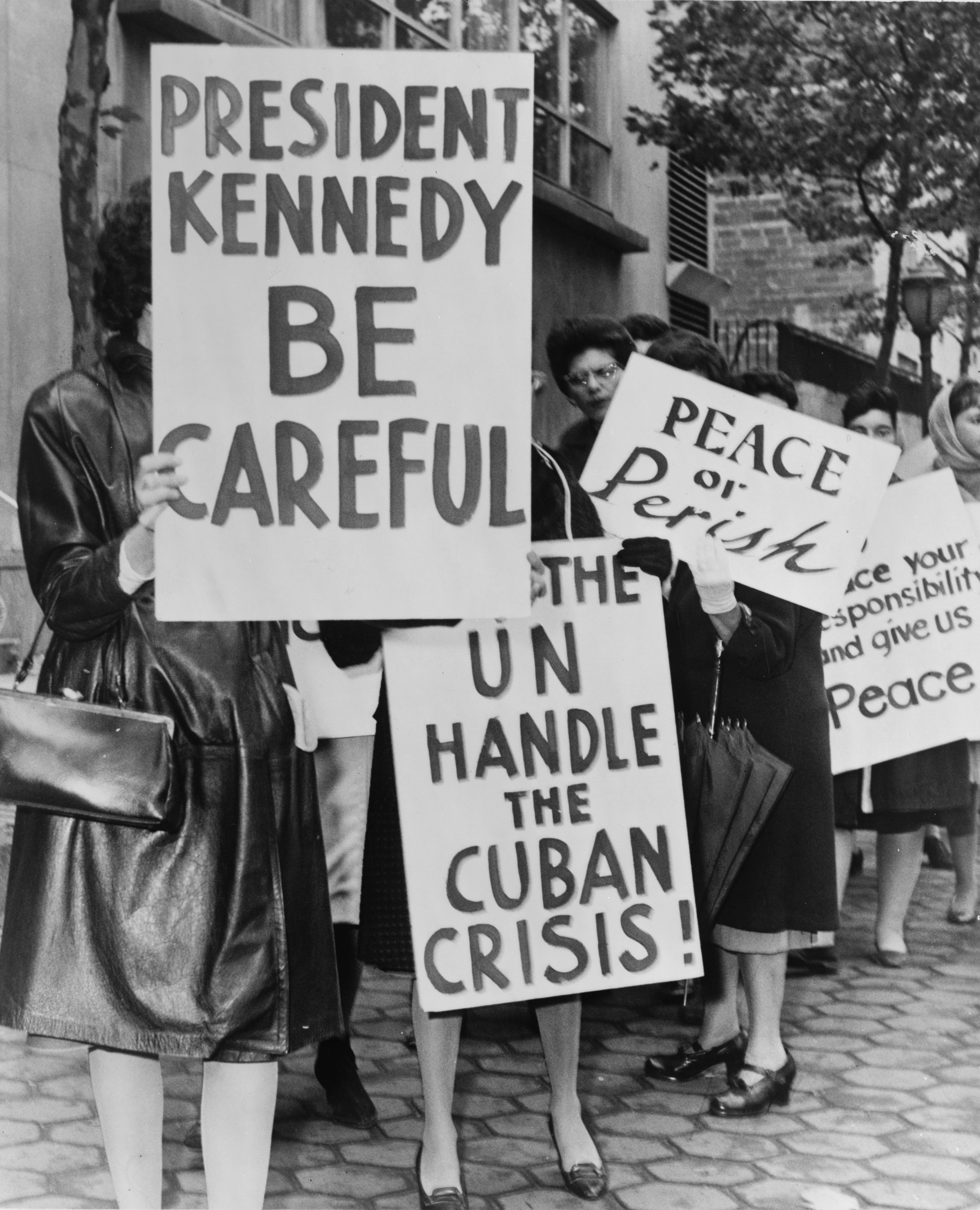
Women Strike for Peace during the Cuban Missile Crisis

Atmospheric ^{14}C Bomb pulse, corresponding to atmospheric nuclear weapons tests, New Zealand and Austria. The New Zealand curve is representative for the Southern Hemisphere, the Austrian curve is representative for the Northern Hemisphere. Atmospheric nuclear weapon tests almost doubled the concentration of ^{14}C in the Northern Hemisphere.

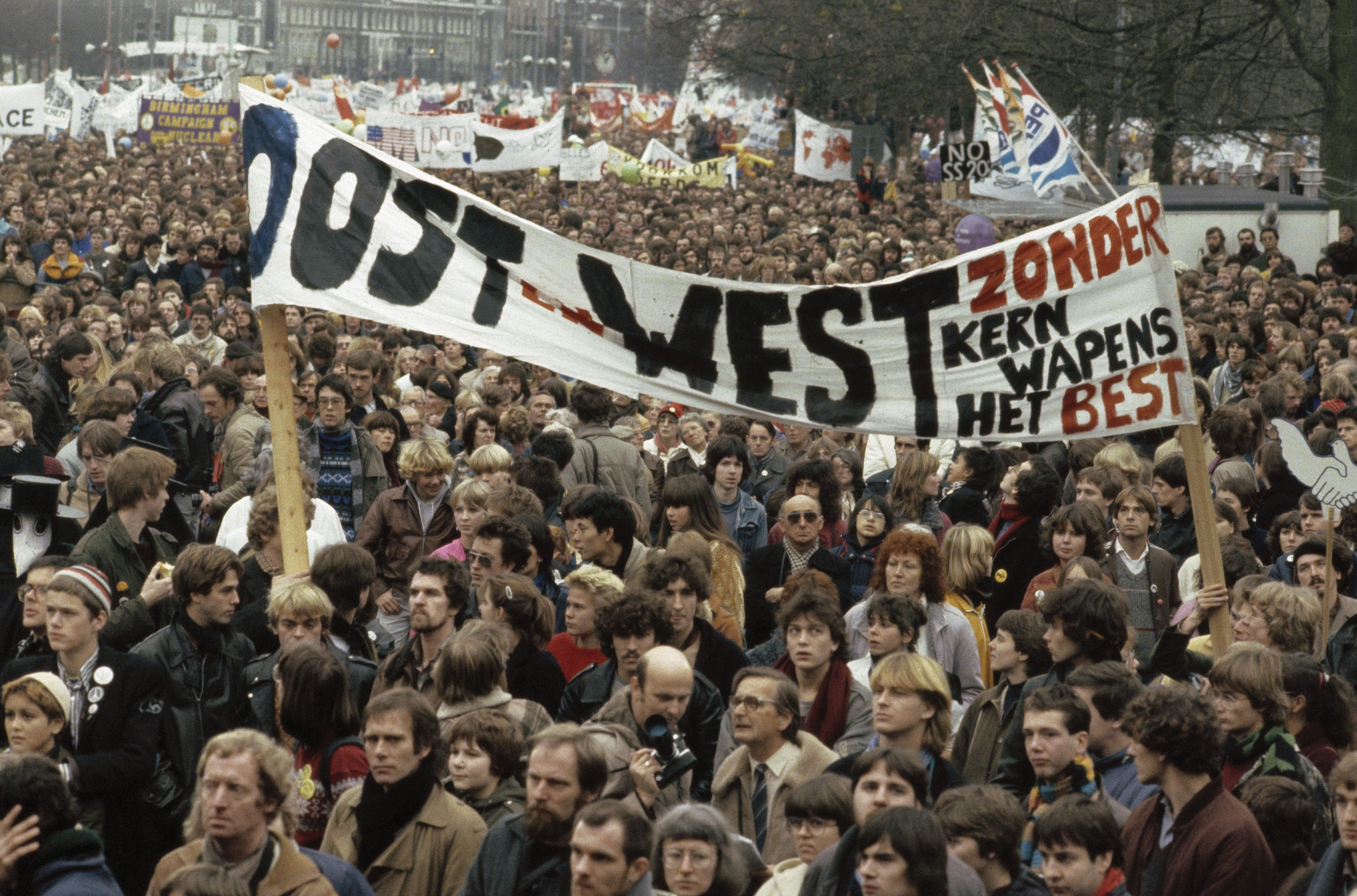
Protest in Amsterdam against the nuclear arms race between the U.S./NATO and the Soviet Union, 1981

The application of nuclear technology, as a source of energy and as an instrument of war, has been controversial. These issues are discussed in nuclear weapons debate, nuclear power debate, and uranium mining debate.

Scientists and diplomats have debated nuclear weapons policy since before the Atomic bombings of Hiroshima and Nagasaki in 1945. The public became concerned about nuclear weapons testing from about 1954, following extensive nuclear testing in the Pacific, with some calling it nuclear imperialism and colonialism. In 1961, at the height of the Cold War, about 50,000 women brought together by Women Strike for Peace marched in 60 cities in the United States to demonstrate against nuclear weapons. In 1963, many countries ratified the Partial Test Ban Treaty which prohibited atmospheric nuclear testing.

Some local opposition to nuclear power emerged in the early 1960s, and, in the late 1960s, some members of the scientific community began expressing their concerns. In the early 1970s, there were large protests about the proposed Wyhl Nuclear Power Plant in southern Germany. The project was cancelled in 1975, and anti-nuclear success at Wyhl inspired opposition to nuclear power in other parts of Europe and North America. Nuclear power became an issue of major public protest in the 1970s.

==== Fossil fuels industry ====
The fossil fuel industry starting from the 1950s was engaging in campaigns against the nuclear industry which it perceived as a threat to their commercial interests. Organizations such as the American Petroleum Institute, the Pennsylvania Independent Oil and Gas Association and Marcellus Shale Coalition were engaged in anti-nuclear lobbying in the late 2010s and from 2019, large fossil fuel suppliers started advertising campaigns portraying fossil gas as a "perfect partner for renewables" (wording from Shell and Statoil advertisements). Groups like the Sierra Club, Environmental Defense Fund and Natural Resources Defense Council are receiving grants from other fossil fuel companies. As of 2011, a strategy paper released by Greenpeace titled "Battle of Grids" proposed gradual replacement of nuclear power by fossil gas plants which would provide "flexible backup for wind and solar power". However, Greenpeace has since distanced itself from advocating for fossil gas, instead proposing grid energy storage as a solution to issues caused by intermittent renewable energy. In Germany, the Energiewende, which was advertised as a shift to renewable energy but included a gradual phaseout of nuclear power from 2000 to the end of 2022, caused, among other things, a rise in fossil gas power production from 49.2 TWh in 2000 to 94.7 TWh in 2020. In the same interval total electricity generation barely changed (576.6 TWh in 2000 vs 574.2 TWh in 2020) while it did rise and fall in the meantime, reaching a peak of 652.9 TWh in 2017. As much of that fossil gas was, and remains, imported from Russia, controversial pipeline projects like Nord Stream 1 were built to meet rising German gas demand. After the 2022 Russian invasion of Ukraine it came to light that significant amounts of Russian lobbying was involved in both the continued anti-nuclear movement in Germany and the anti-fracking movement.

=== Anti-nuclear perspectives ===
==== Concerns about nuclear weapons ====
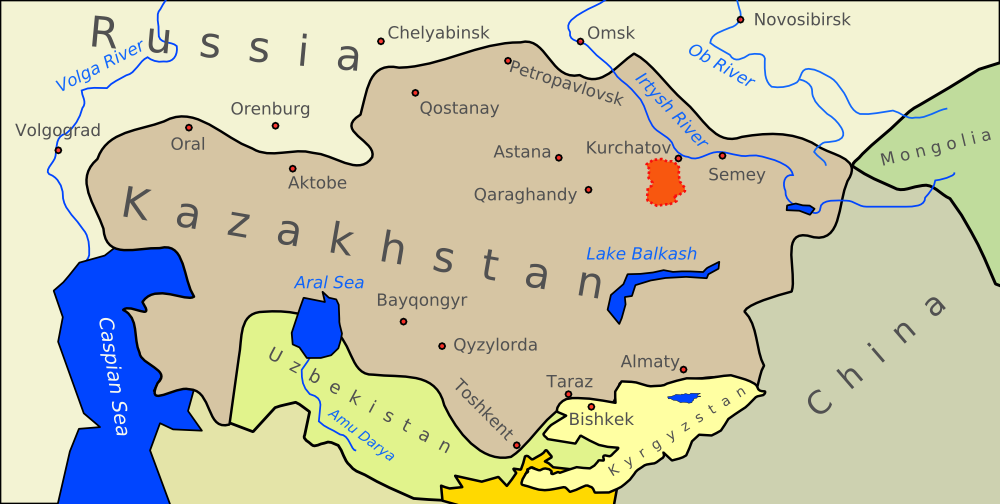
The 18,000 km^{2} expanse of the Semipalatinsk Test Site (indicated in red), which covers an area the size of Wales. The Soviet Union conducted 456 nuclear tests at Semipalatinsk from 1949 until 1989 with little regard for their effect on the local people or environment. The full impact of radiation exposure was hidden for many years by Soviet authorities and has only come to light since the test site closed in 1991.

From an anti-nuclear point of view, there is a threat to modern civilization from global nuclear war by accidental or deliberate nuclear strike. Some climate scientists estimate that a war between two countries that resulted in 100 Hiroshima-size atomic explosions would cause significant loss of life, in the tens of millions, from climatic effects alone, as well as disable future generations. Soot thrown up into the atmosphere could blanket the earth, causing food chain disruption in what is termed a nuclear winter.

Many anti-nuclear weapons groups cite the 1996 Advisory Opinion of the International Court of Justice, Legality of the Threat or Use of Nuclear Weapons, in which it found that 'the threat or use of nuclear weapons would generally be contrary to the rules of international law applicable in armed conflict'.

Ridding the world of nuclear weapons has been a cause for pacifists for decades. But more recently, mainstream politicians and retired military leaders have advocated nuclear disarmament. In January 2007 an article in The Wall Street Journal, authored by Henry Kissinger, Bill Perry, George Shultz and Sam Nunn. These men were veterans of the Cold War who believed in using nuclear weapons for deterrence. But they now reversed their previous position and asserted that instead of making the world safer, nuclear weapons had become a source of extreme concern.

Since the 1970s, some countries have built their own second-strike capability of massive deterrence in the event of a military attack with weapons of mass destruction. Two examples of this second-strike capability are Israel's Samson Option strategy and Russia's Dead Hand system. During the era of nuclear weapons testing, many local communities were affected, and some are still affected by uranium mining and radioactive waste disposal.

It should, however, be noted that countries can possess nuclear weapons without possessing nuclear power plants (as is almost certainly the case with Israel) or indeed the reverse, as is the case with most users of nuclear power, past and present.

==== Concerns about nuclear power ====
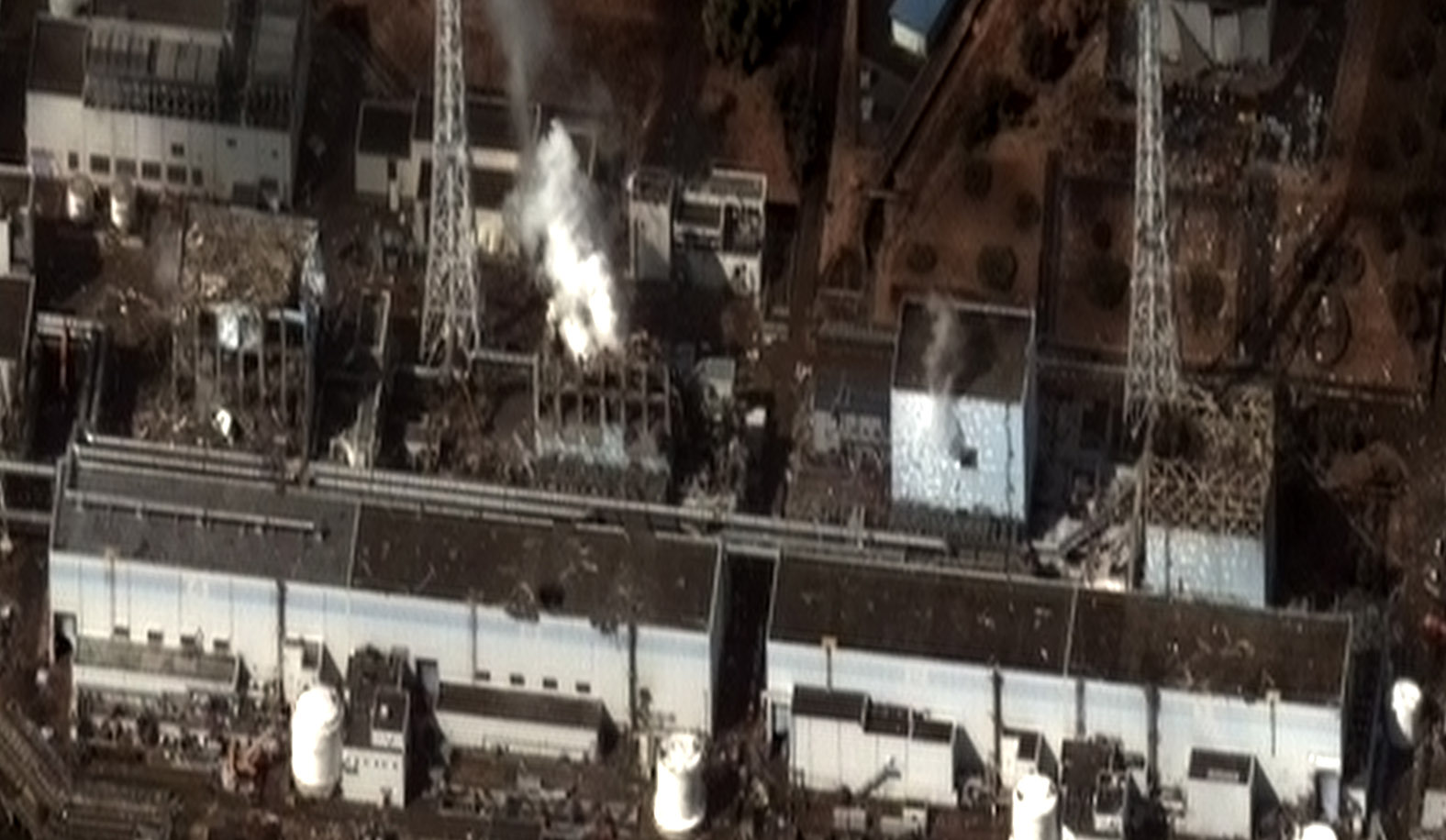
Following the 2011 Japanese Fukushima nuclear disaster, authorities shut down the nation's 54 nuclear power plants. As of 2013, the Fukushima site remains highly radioactive, with some 160,000 evacuees still living in temporary housing, and some land will be unfarmable for centuries. The difficult cleanup job will take 40 or more years, and cost tens of billions of dollars. However it has also been criticised that the initial decontamination target of the Japanese government to of 5 mSv has been abandoned in favour of a plan to limit the additional radiation dosage to less than 1 mSv increasing the expenses, the radiological necessity of this is disputed.

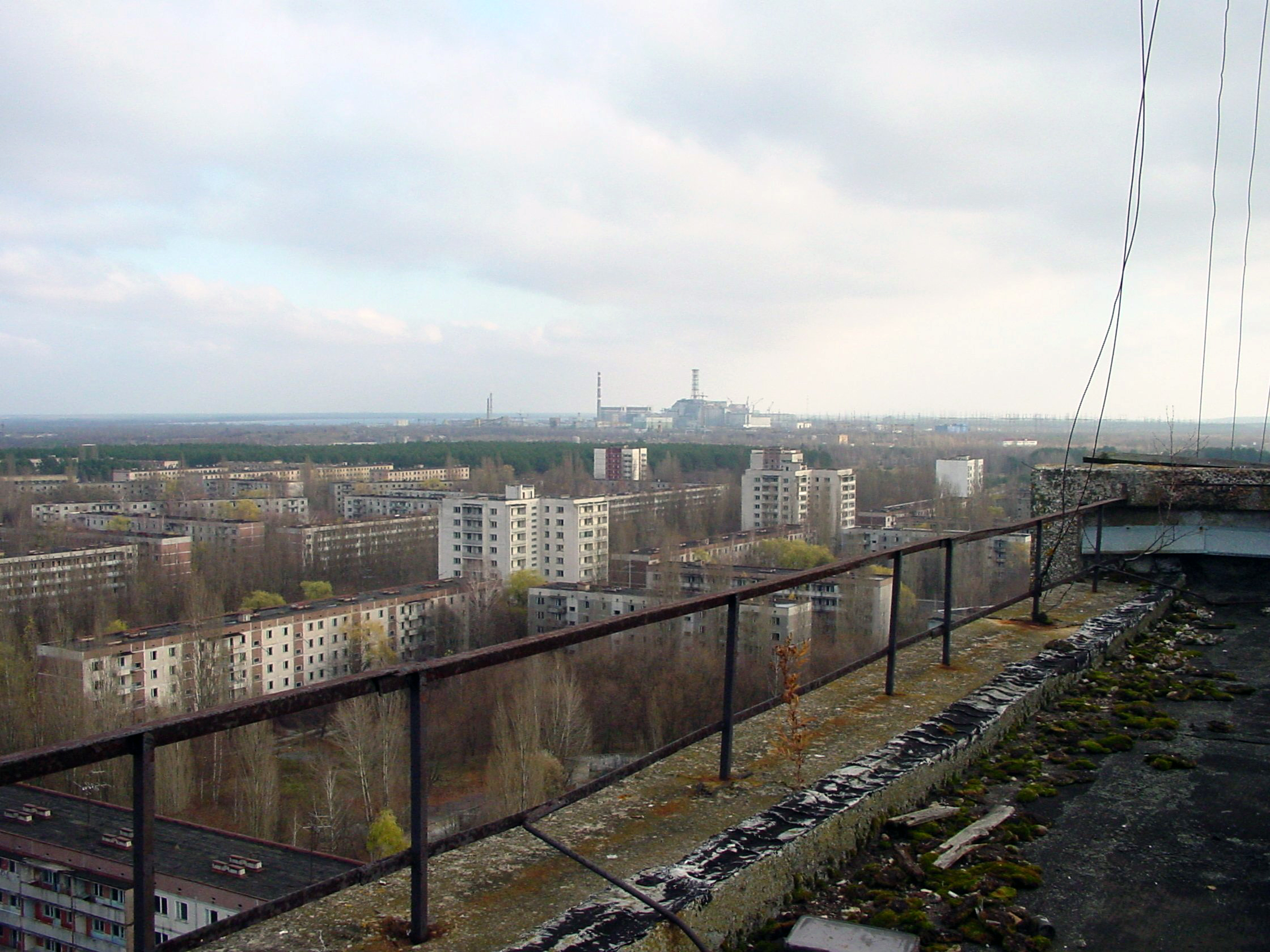
The abandoned city of Prypiat, Ukraine, following the April 1986 Chernobyl disaster. The Chernobyl nuclear power plant is in the background.

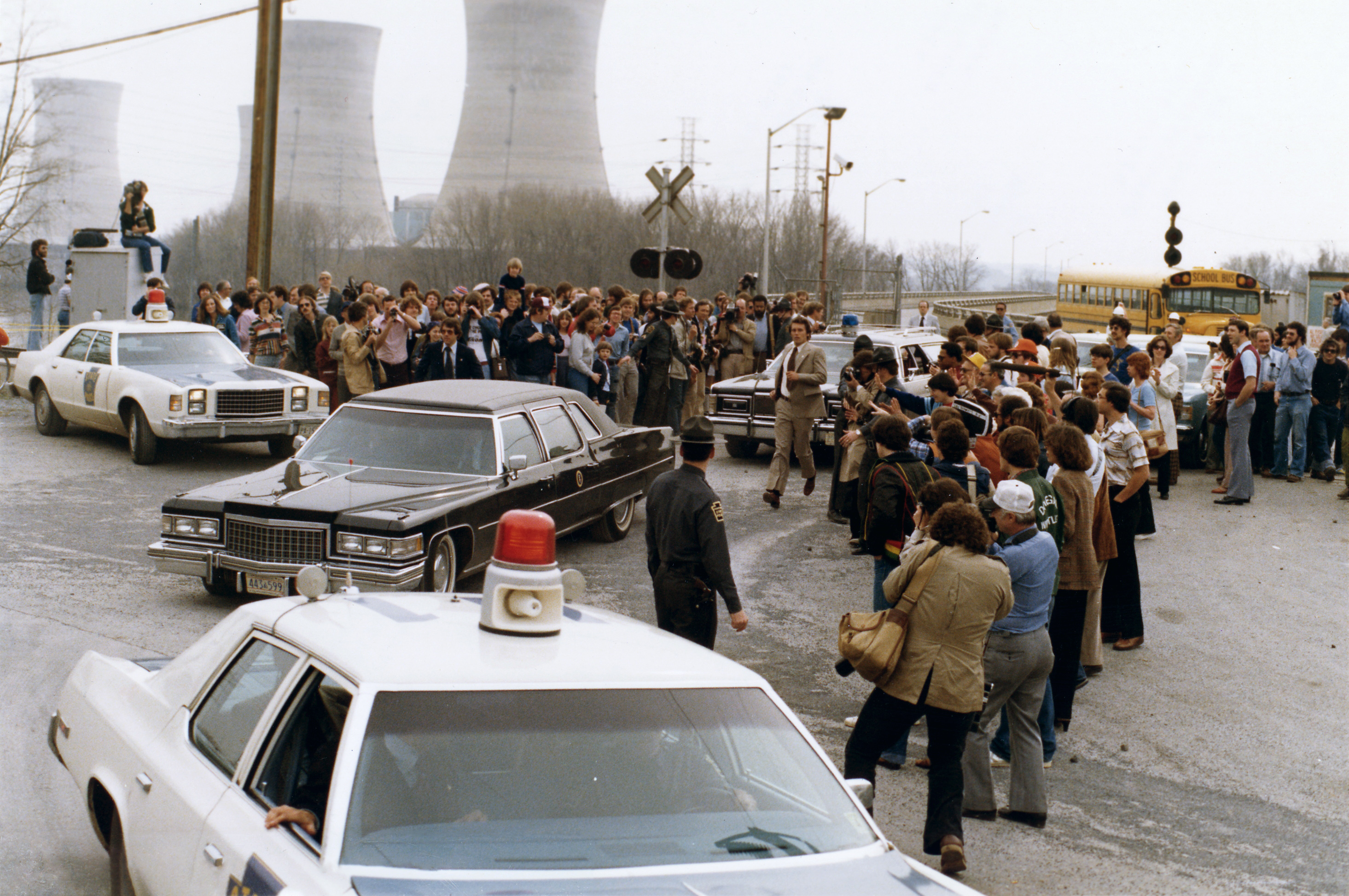
President Jimmy Carter leaving the Three Mile Island accident for Middletown, Pennsylvania, 1 April 1979

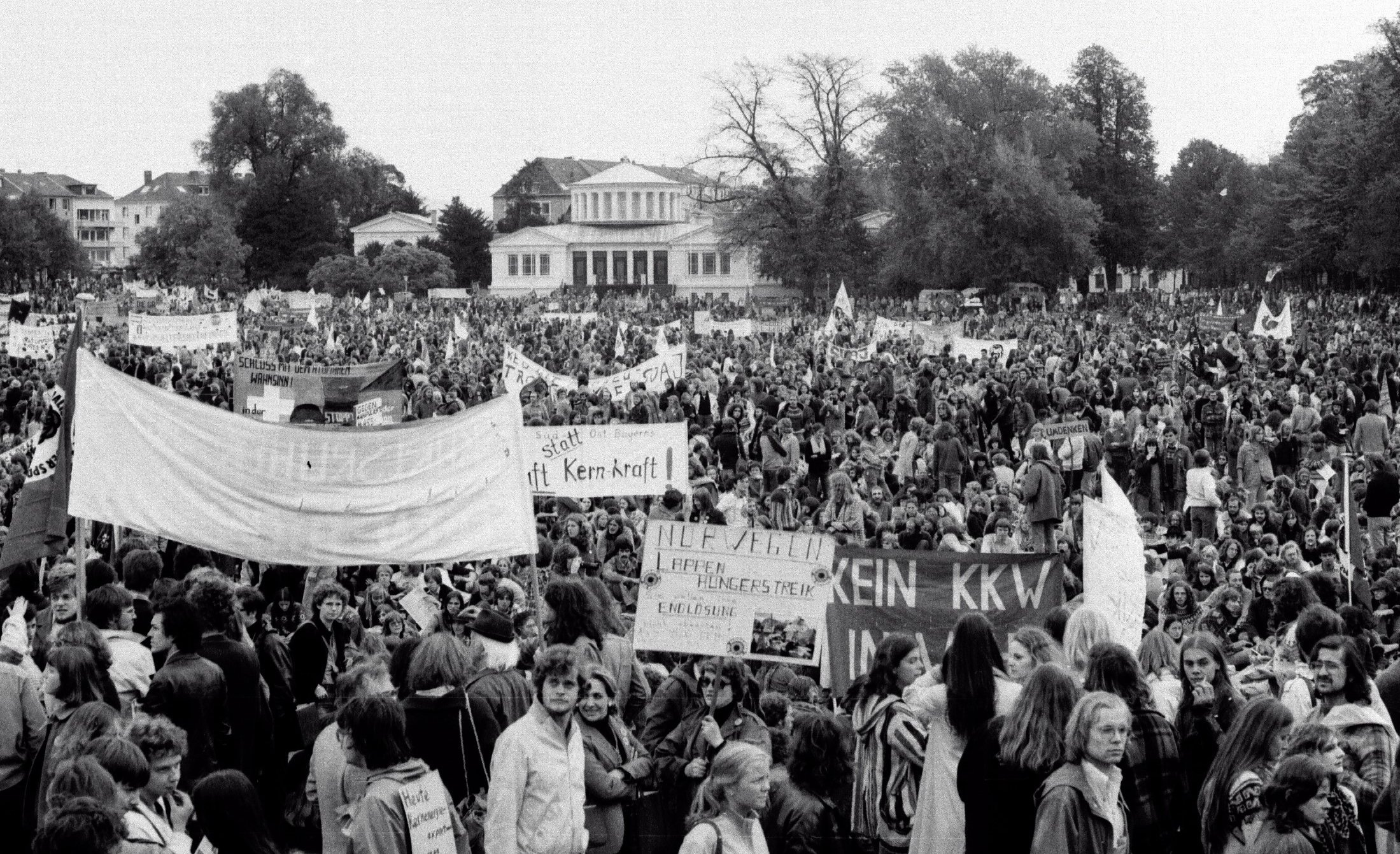
Anti-nuclear protest on 14 October 1979, in Bonn, capital city of West Germany

There are large variations in people's beliefs regarding nuclear power, including the technology itself, its deployment, climate change, and energy security. There is a wide spectrum of views and concerns over nuclear power and it remains a controversial area of public policy. When compared to other energy sources, nuclear power has one of the lowest death rates per unit of energy produced – 0.07 per TWh, as compared to over 32 per TWh in the case of brown coal. This figure is driven by a 2005 WHO projection of up to 4000 stochastic cancer deaths that could result from the Chernobyl disaster. The UNSCEAR reports in its 2008 summary on Chernobyl that no increases in cancer incidence (other than thyroid cancer) have been observed to date that can be attributed to radiation from the accident.

Many studies have shown that the public "perceives nuclear power as a very risky technology" and, around the world, nuclear energy declined in popularity in the aftermath of the Fukushima Daiichi nuclear disaster, but it has recently rebounded in response to the climate crisis. Anti-nuclear critics see nuclear power as a dangerous, expensive way to boil water to generate electricity. Opponents of nuclear power have raised many related concerns:

- Nuclear accidents: a safety concern that the core of a nuclear power plant could overheat and melt down, releasing radioactivity.
- Nuclear Fuel Mining: mining waste of nuclear fuels like uranium and thorium, results in its radioactive decay. That causes radium pollution and radon pollution in environment and ultimately affects public health.
- Radioactive waste disposal: a concern that nuclear power results in large amounts of radioactive waste, some of which remains dangerous for very long periods.
- Nuclear proliferation: a concern that some types of nuclear reactor designs use and/or produce fissile material which could be used in nuclear weapons.
- High cost: a concern that nuclear power plants are very expensive to build, and that clean up from nuclear accidents is highly expensive and can take decades.
- Attacks on nuclear plants: a concern that terrorists or criminals could target nuclear facilities.
- Curtailed civil liberties: a concern that the risk of nuclear accidents, proliferation, and terrorism may be used to justify restraints on citizen rights.

Of these concerns, nuclear accidents and disposal of long-lived radioactive waste have probably had the greatest public impact worldwide. Anti-nuclear campaigners point to the 2011 Fukushima nuclear emergency as proof that nuclear power can never be 100% safe. Costs resulting from the Fukushima Daiichi nuclear disaster are likely to exceed 12 trillion yen ($100 billion) and the clean up effort to decontaminate affected areas and decommission the plant is estimated to take 30 to 40 years. Excluding accidents, the standard amount of high-level radioactive waste is claimed to be manageable (the UK has produced just 2150 m^{3} during its 60-year nuclear program), with the Geological Society of London alleging that it can be effectively recycled and stored safely.

In his book Global Fission: The Battle Over Nuclear Power, Jim Falk explores connections between technological concerns and political concerns. Falk suggests that concerns of citizen groups or individuals who oppose nuclear power have often focused initially on the "range of physical hazards which accompany the technology" and lead to a "concern over the political relations of the nuclear industry". Baruch Fischhoff, a social scientist, said that many people really do not trust the nuclear industry. Wade Allison, a physicist, said "radiation is safe & all nations should embrace nuclear technology"

M.V. Ramana says that "distrust of the social institutions that manage nuclear energy is widespread", and a 2001 survey by the European Commission found that "only 10.1 percent of Europeans trusted the nuclear industry". This public distrust is periodically reinforced by nuclear safety violations or through ineffectiveness or corruption of the nuclear regulatory authorities. Once lost, says Ramana, trust is extremely difficult to regain.

Faced with public antipathy, the nuclear industry has "tried a variety of strategies to persuade the public to accept nuclear power," including publishing numerous "fact sheets" that address public concerns. M.V. Ramana says that none of these strategies has been very successful. Nuclear proponents have tried to regain public support by offering newer, purportedly safer, reactor designs. These designs include those that incorporate passive safety and small modular reactors. While these reactor designs "are intended to inspire trust, they may have an unintended effect: creating distrust of older reactors that lack the touted safety features".

Since 2000 the nuclear power was promoted as potential solution to the greenhouse effect and climate change as nuclear power emits no or negligible amounts of carbon dioxide during operations. Anti-nuclear groups highlighted that other stages of the nuclear fuel chain – mining, milling, transport, fuel fabrication, enrichment, reactor construction, decommissioning, and waste management – rely on fossil fuels and thus emit carbon dioxide. As this is the case with any energy sources, including renewable energy, IPCC analyzed total life-cycle greenhouse-gas emissions, which account for all emissions during manufacturing, installation, operations and decommissioning. With 12 gCO2eq/kWh, nuclear power remains one of the lowest-emitting energy sources available.

In 2011, a French court fined Électricité de France (EDF) €1.5m and jailed two senior employees for spying on Greenpeace, including hacking into Greenpeace's computer systems. Greenpeace was awarded €500,000 in damages.

Some energy-related studies conclude that energy efficiency programs and renewable power technologies are better energy options than nuclear power plants.

==== Other technologies ====
The international nuclear fusion project, the International Thermonuclear Experimental Reactor (ITER), is constructing the world's largest and most advanced experimental tokamak nuclear fusion reactor in southern France. A collaboration among the European Union (EU), India, Japan, China, Russia, South Korea, and the United States, the project aims to transition from experimental studies of plasma physics to electricity-producing fusion power plants. In 2005, Greenpeace International issued a press statement criticizing government funding of the ITER, believing the money should have been diverted to renewable energy sources and claiming that fusion energy would result in nuclear waste and nuclear weapons proliferation issues. A French association including about 700 anti-nuclear groups, Sortir du nucléaire (Get Out of Nuclear Energy), claimed that ITER was a hazard because scientists did not yet know how to manipulate the high-energy deuterium and tritium hydrogen isotopes used in the fusion process. According to most anti-nuclear groups, nuclear fusion power "remains a distant dream". The World Nuclear Association have said that fusion "presents so far insurmountable scientific and engineering challenges". Construction of the ITER facility began in 2007, but the project has run into many delays and budget overruns. Several milestones of the project have already been completed, but the First Plasma completion date has been discussed and postponed multiple times, with various conclusions. In late 2016, the ITER council agreed on an updated project schedule, with a planned First Plasma opening by 2025, nine years after the originally anticipated opening.

Some anti-nuclear groups advocate reduced reliance on reactor-produced medical radioisotopes, through the use of alternative radioisotope production and alternative clinical technologies. Cyclotrons are being increasingly used to produce medical radioisotopes to the point where nuclear reactors are no longer needed to make the most common medical isotopes. However, the development of newer, more reliable and efficient particle accelerators also fuels the proposals for subcritical reactors with a Spallation Neutron Source being used for nuclear transmutation of "legacy" waste and/or power generation. Such reactors could also be used to produce medical isotopes. Some isotopes, like Cobalt-60 are currently mostly produced in reactors like the Canadian CANDU.Plutonium-238, the preferred material for radioisotope thermal generators for use in spacecraft, faced a significant shortage after a single reactor producing it shut down, before the U.S. established a capacity to produce it from Neptunium-237 at one of their laboratories.

=== Nuclear-free alternatives ===
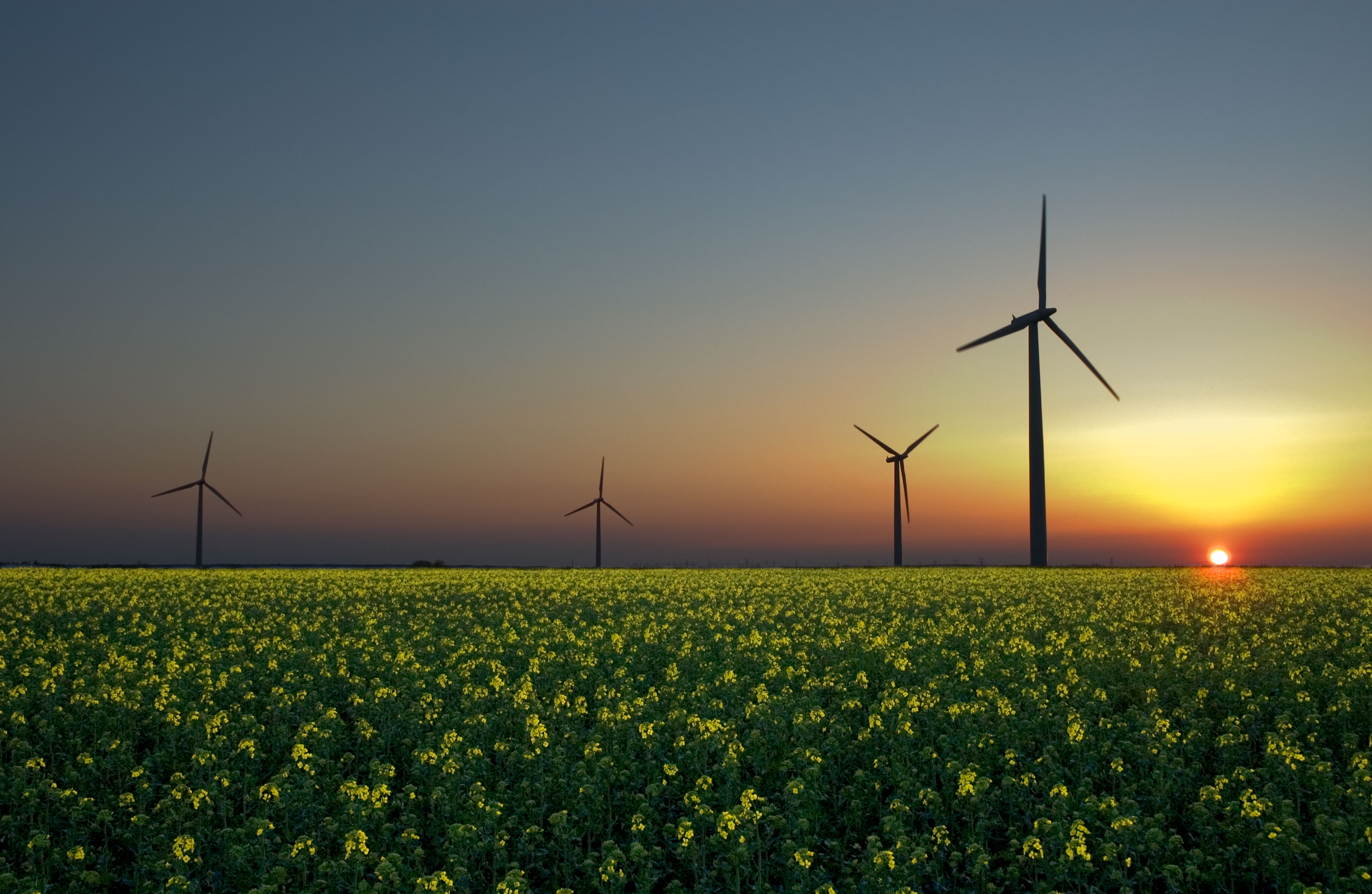
Three renewable energy sources: solar energy, wind power, and hydroelectricity

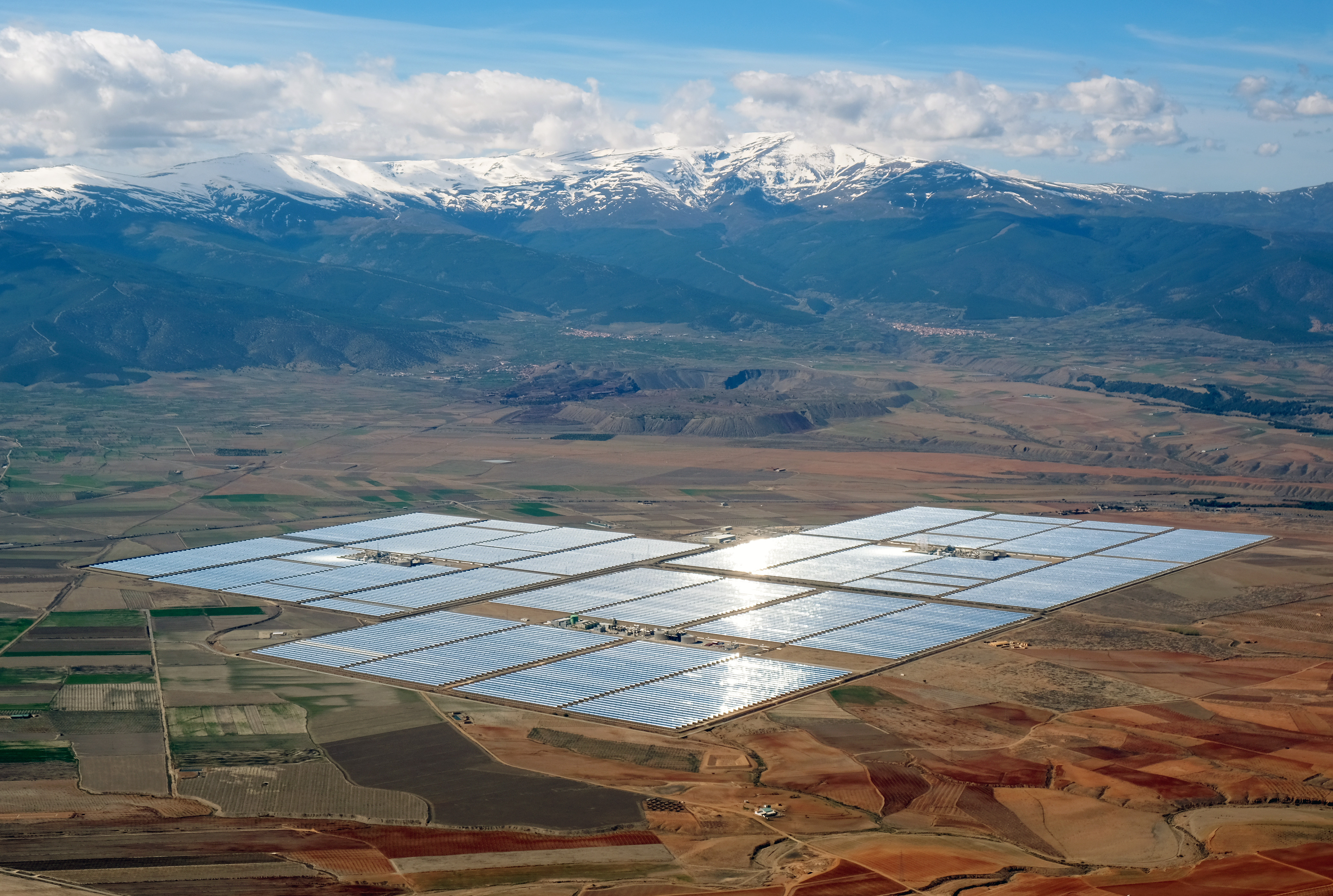
The 150 MW Andasol Solar Power Station is a commercial parabolic trough solar thermal power plant, located in Spain. The Andasol plant uses molten-salt tanks to store solar energy, allowing it to continue generating electricity even when the sun isn't shining.

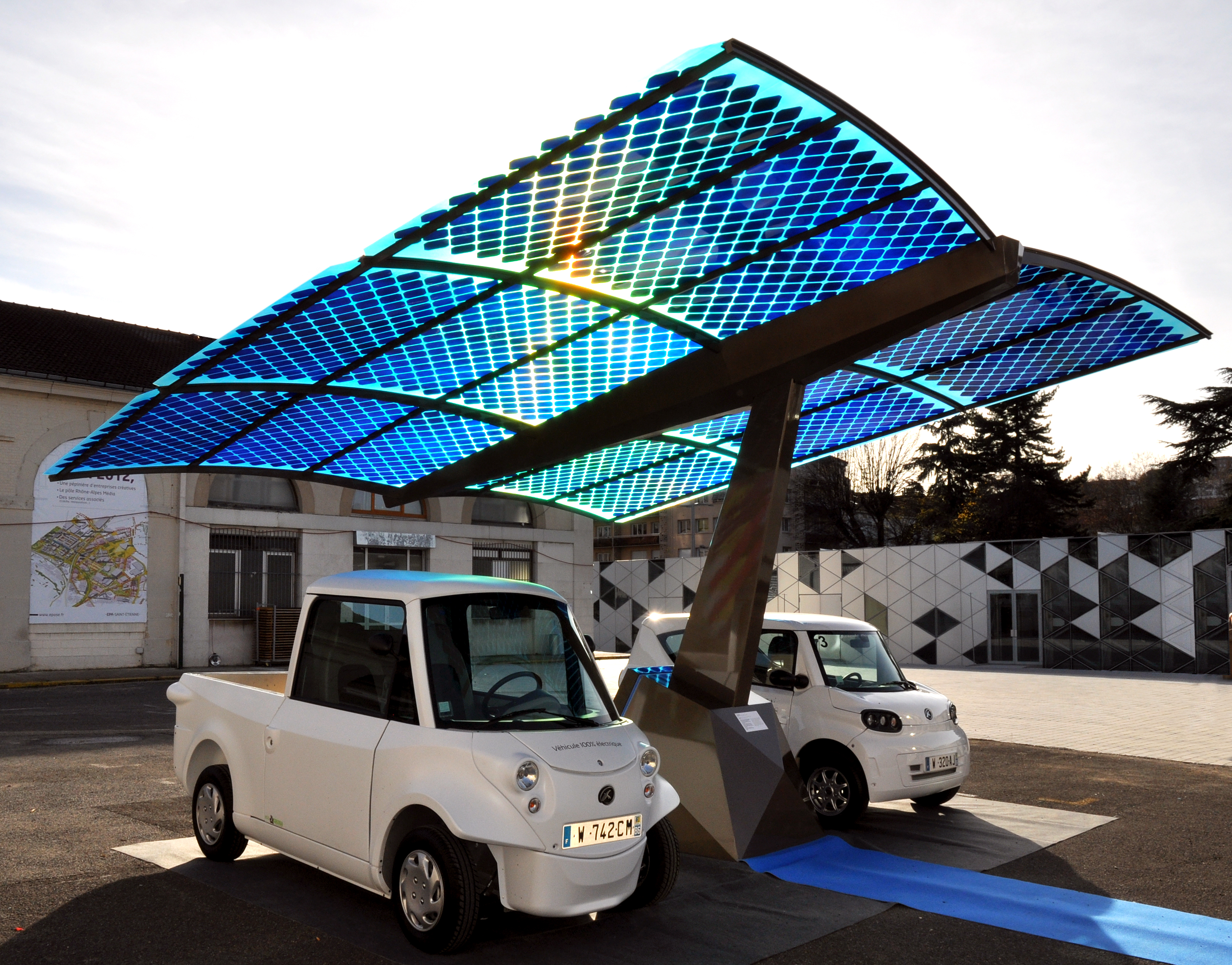
Photovoltaic SUDI shade is an autonomous and mobile station in France that provides energy for electric vehicles using solar energy.

Anti-nuclear groups say that reliance on nuclear energy can be reduced by adopting energy conservation and energy efficiency measures. Energy efficiency can reduce energy consumption while providing the same level of energy "services". Renewable energy flows involve natural phenomena such as sunlight, wind, tides, plant growth, and geothermal heat, as the International Energy Agency explains:

Renewable energy is derived from natural processes that are replenished constantly. In its various forms, it derives directly from the sun, or from heat generated deep within the earth. Included in the definition is electricity and heat generated from solar, wind, ocean, hydropower, biomass, geothermal resources, and biofuels and hydrogen derived from renewable resources.

Anti-nuclear groups also favour the use of renewable energy, such as hydro, wind power, solar power, geothermal energy and biofuel. According to the International Energy Agency renewable energy technologies are essential contributors to the energy supply portfolio, as they contribute to world energy security and provide opportunities for mitigating greenhouse gases. Fossil fuels are being replaced by clean, climate-stabilizing, non-depletable sources of energy. According to Lester R. Brown:

…the transition from coal, oil, and gas to wind, solar, and geothermal energy is well under way. In the old economy, energy was produced by burning something – oil, coal, or natural gas – leading to the carbon emissions that have come to define our economy. The new energy economy harnesses the energy in wind, the energy coming from the sun, and heat from within the earth itself.

In 2014 global wind power capacity expanded 16% to 369,553 MW. Yearly wind energy production is also growing rapidly and has reached around 4% of worldwide electricity usage, 11.4% in the EU, and it is widely used in Asia, and the United States. In 2014, worldwide installed photovoltaics capacity increased to 177 gigawatts (GW), sufficient to supply 1 per cent of global electricity demands. As of 2020 wind power expansion slowed down due to protests of residents and environmentalists.

Solar thermal energy stations operate in the United States and Spain, and as of 2016, the largest of these is the 392 MW Ivanpah Solar Electric Generating System in California. The world's largest geothermal power installation is The Geysers in California, with a rated capacity of 750 MW. Brazil has one of the largest renewable energy programs in the world, involving production of ethanol fuel from sugar cane, and ethanol now provides 18% of the country's automotive fuel. Ethanol fuel is also widely available in the United States. As of 2020, the expansion of biomass as a fuel, which was previously praised by environmental organizations such as Greenpeace, has been criticized for environmental damage.

Greenpeace advocates reducing fossil fuel use by 50% by 2050 and phasing out nuclear power, contending that innovative technologies can increase energy efficiency and suggesting that, by 2050, most electricity will come from renewable sources. The International Energy Agency estimates that nearly 50% of global electricity supplies will need to come from renewable energy sources to halve carbon dioxide emissions by 2050 and minimise climate change impacts.

Mark Z. Jacobson says producing all new energy with wind power, solar power, and hydropower by 2030 is feasible, and existing energy supply arrangements could be replaced by 2050. Barriers to implementing the renewable energy plan are seen to be "primarily social and political, not technological or economic". Jacobson says that energy costs with a wind, solar, and water system should be similar to today's energy costs. Many have since referred to Jacobson's work to justify advocating for all 100% renewables, however, in February 2017, a group of twenty-one scientists published a critique of Jacobson's work and found that his analysis involves "errors, inappropriate methods and implausible assumptions" and failed to provide "credible evidence for rejecting the conclusions of previous analyses that point to the benefits of considering a broad portfolio of energy system options."

Critics state that the anti-nuclear arguments overestimate the benefits of renewable energy and fail to consider land per unit of energy inefficiencies and data that claims to forecast, "...biomass, wind, and solar power are set to occupy an area equivalent to the size of the European Union by 2050."

== Anti-nuclear organizations ==
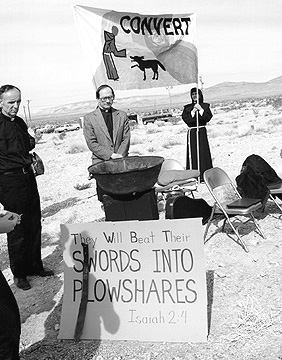
Members of Nevada Desert Experience hold a prayer vigil during the Easter period of 1982 at the entrance to the Nevada Test Site.

The anti-nuclear movement is a social movement which operates at the local, national, and international level. Various types of groups have identified themselves with the movement:

- direct action groups, such as the Clamshell Alliance and Shad Alliance
- environmental groups, such as Friends of the Earth and Greenpeace
- consumer protection groups, such as Ralph Nader's Critical Mass
- professional organisations, such as International Physicians for the Prevention of Nuclear War
- political parties such as European Free Alliance

Anti-nuclear groups have undertaken public protests and acts of civil disobedience, including occupations of nuclear plant sites. Other salient strategies have included lobbying, petitioning government authorities, influencing public policy through referendum campaigns, and involvement in elections. Anti-nuclear groups have also tried to influence policy implementation through litigation and by participating in licensing proceedings.

Anti-nuclear power organisations have emerged in every country that has had a nuclear power programme. Protest movements against nuclear power first emerged in the United States at the local level and quickly spread to Europe and the rest of the world. National nuclear campaigns emerged in the late 1970s. Fuelled by the Three Mile Island accident and the Chernobyl disaster, the anti-nuclear power movement mobilised political and economic forces that, for some years, "made nuclear energy untenable in many countries". In the 1970s and 1980s, the formation of green parties was often a direct result of anti-nuclear politics (e.g., in Germany and Sweden).

Some of these anti-nuclear power organisations are reported to have developed considerable expertise on nuclear power and energy issues. In 1992, the chairman of the Nuclear Regulatory Commission said that "his agency had been pushed in the right direction on safety issues because of the pleas and protests of nuclear watchdog groups".

=== International organizations ===
- European Nuclear Disarmament, which held annual conventions in the 1980s involving thousands of anti-nuclear weapons activists mostly from Western Europe but also from Eastern Europe, the United States, and Australia.
- Friends of the Earth International, a network of environmental organizations in 77 countries. Since 2014, however, Friends of the Earth (UK) has softened its stance; the fierce opposition against nuclear reactors has shifted into a more pragmatic opposition, which still opposes the construction of new nuclear (fission) reactors, but doesn't campaign against closing down the existing ones anymore.
- Global Zero, an international non-partisan group of 300 world leaders dedicated to achieving the elimination of nuclear weapons.
- Global Initiative to Combat Nuclear Terrorism, an international partnership of 83 nations.
- Greenpeace International, a non-governmental environmental organization with offices in over 41 countries and headquarters in Amsterdam, Netherlands.
- International Campaign to Abolish Nuclear Weapons
- International Network of Engineers and Scientists for Global Responsibility
- International Physicians for the Prevention of Nuclear War, which had affiliates in 41 nations in 1985, representing 135,000 physicians; IPPNW was awarded the UNESCO Peace Education Prize in 1984 and the Nobel Peace Prize in 1985.
- Nuclear Information and Resource Service
- OPANAL
- Parliamentarians for Nuclear Non-Proliferation and Disarmament, a global network of over 700 parliamentarians from more than 75 countries working to prevent nuclear proliferation
- Pax Christi International, a Catholic group which took a "sharply anti-nuclear stand"
- Ploughshares Fund
- Pugwash Conferences on Science and World Affairs
- Socialist International, the world body of social democratic parties
- Sōka Gakkai, a peace-oriented Buddhist organisation, which held anti-nuclear exhibitions in Japanese cities during the late 1970s, and gathered 10 million signatures on petitions calling for the abolition of nuclear weapons
- United Nations Office for Disarmament Affairs
- World Disarmament Campaign
- World Information Service on Energy, based in Amsterdam, the Netherlands
- World Union for Protection of Life

=== Other groups ===
National and local anti-nuclear groups are listed at Anti-nuclear groups in the United States and List of anti-nuclear groups.

=== Symbols ===
Anti-nuclear symbols
The Campaign for Nuclear Disarmament symbol, designed in 1958. It later became a universal peace symbol used in many different versions worldwide.

Anti-nuclear power movement's Smiling Sun logo: "Nuclear Power? No Thanks"

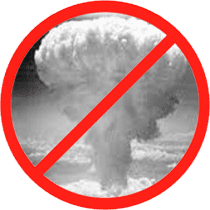
Anti-nuclear symbol, a variation of a mushroom cloud, and a "no" sign

== Activities ==
=== Large protests ===
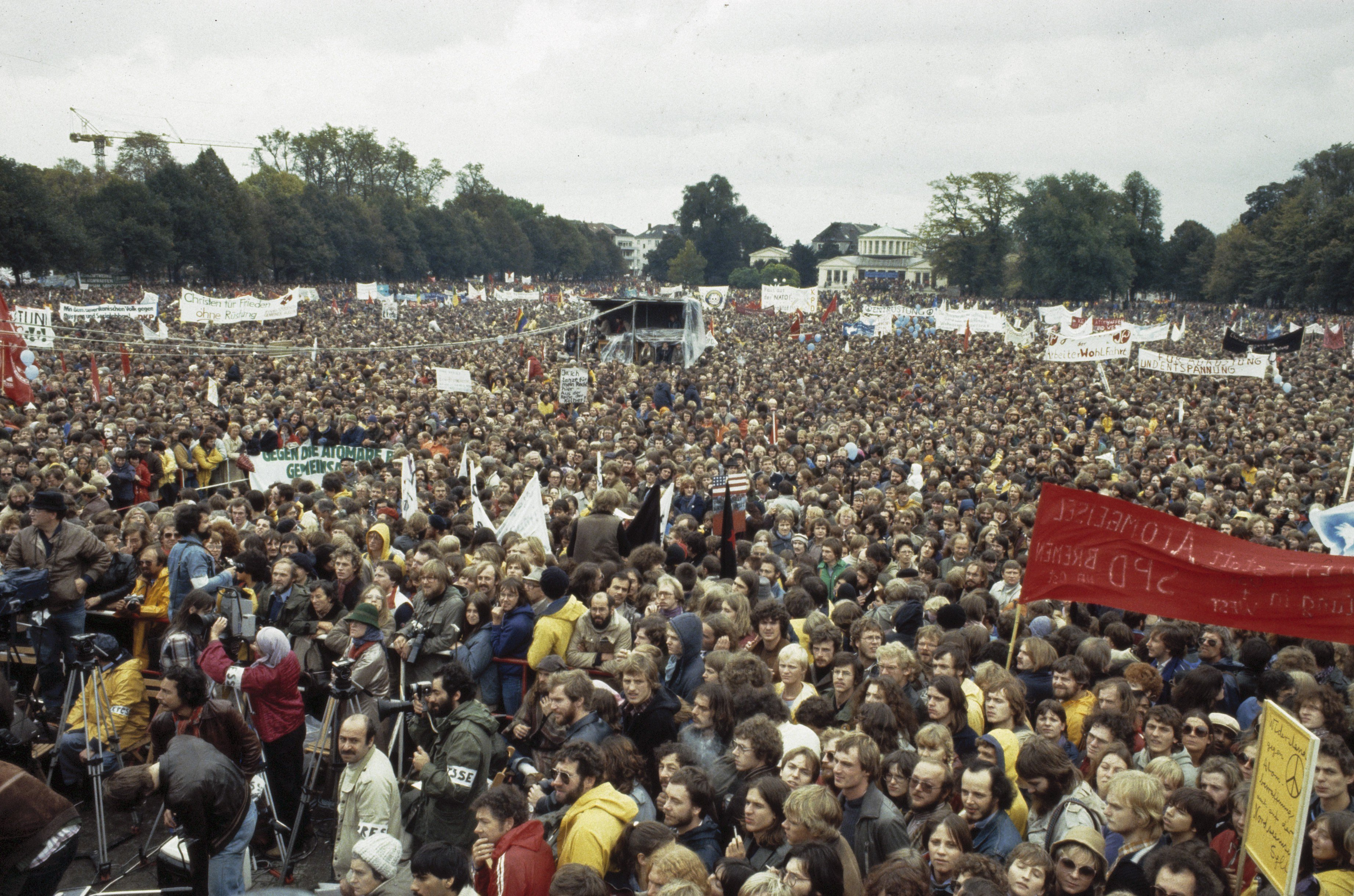
Protest in Bonn against the deployment of Pershing II missiles in Europe, 1981

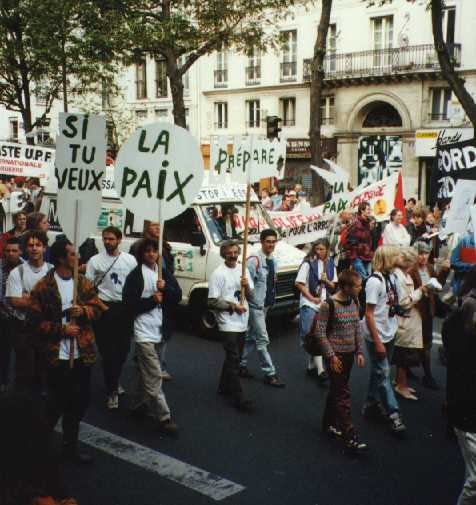
Demonstration against French nuclear testing in 1995 in Paris

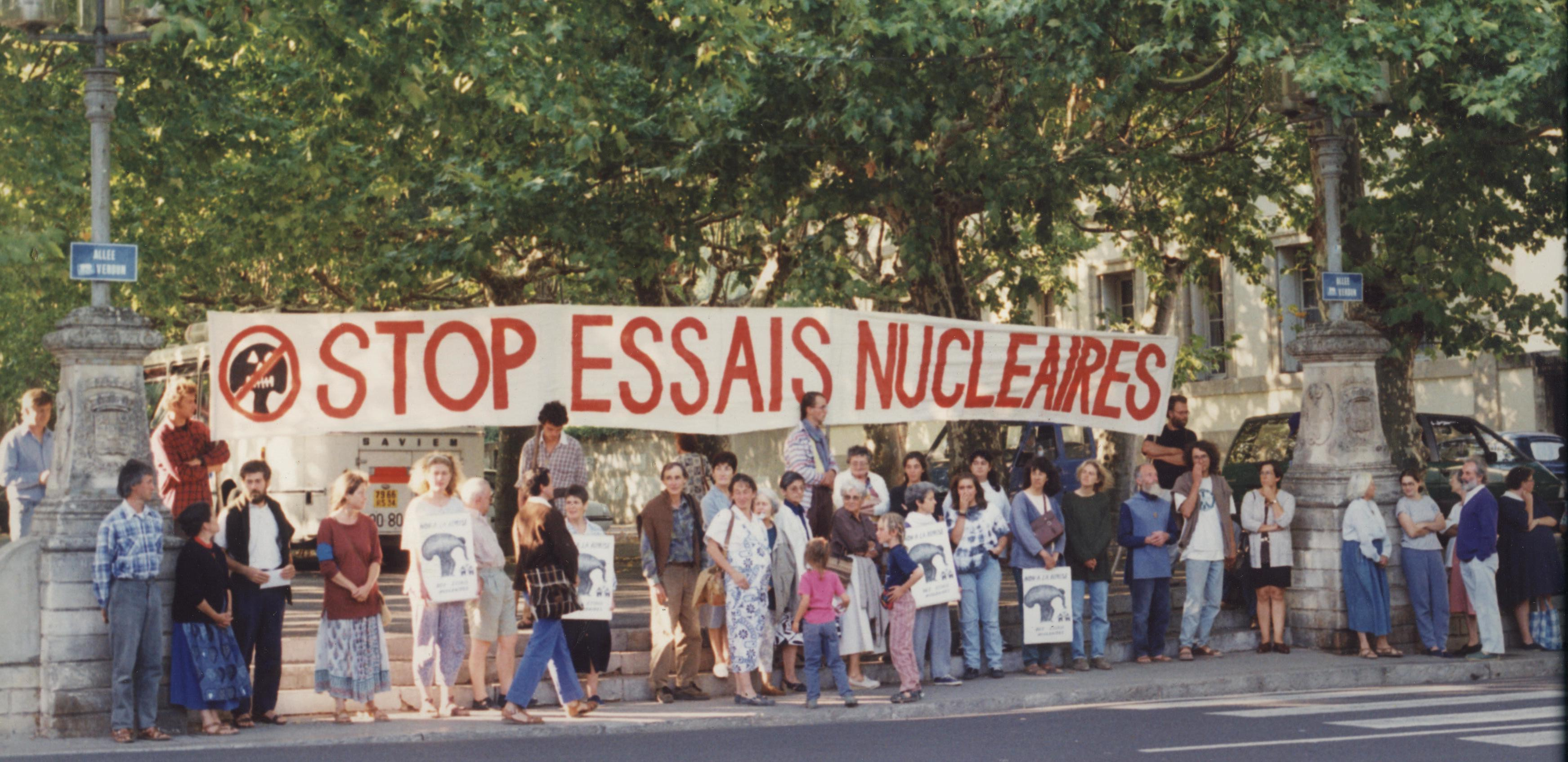
Demonstration in Lyon, France, in the 1980s against nuclear tests

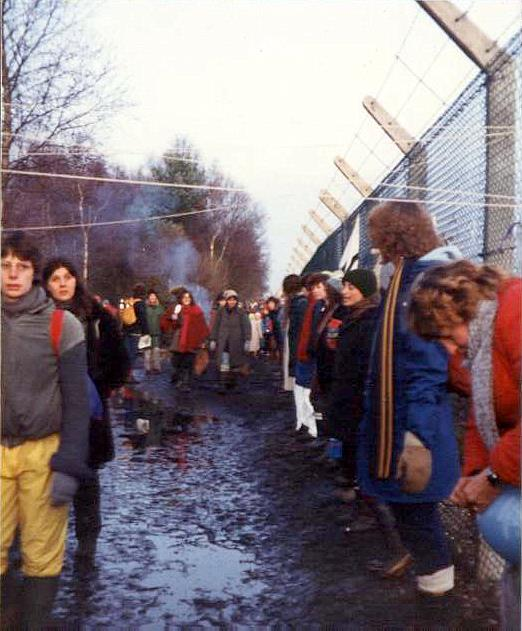
On 12 December 1982, 30,000 women held hands around the 6 miles (9.7 km) perimeter of the base, in protest against the decision to site American cruise missiles there.

In 1971, the town of Wyhl, on the Rhine in Southern Germany, was proposed as the site of the Wyhl Nuclear Power Plant. In the years that followed, public opposition steadily mounted, and large protests occurred. Television coverage of police dragging away farmers and their wives helped to turn nuclear power into a major issue. In 1975, an administrative court withdrew the construction licence for the plant. The Wyhl experience encouraged the formation of citizen action groups near other planned nuclear sites.

In 1972, the nuclear disarmament movement maintained a presence in the Pacific, largely in response to French nuclear testing there. New Zealand activists sailed boats into the test zone, interrupting the testing program. In Australia, thousands of people joined protest marches in Adelaide, Melbourne, Brisbane, and Sydney. Scientists issued statements demanding an end to the nuclear tests. In Fiji, anti-nuclear activists formed an Against Testing on Mururoa organization.

In the Basque Country (Spain and France), a strong anti-nuclear movement emerged in 1973, ultimately leading to the abandonment of most planned nuclear power projects. On 14 July 1977, in Bilbao, between 150,000 and 200,000 people protested against the Lemoniz Nuclear Power Plant. This has been called the "biggest ever anti-nuclear demonstration".

In France, there were mass protests in the early 1970s, organized at nearly every planned nuclear site. Between 1975 and 1977, some 175,000 people protested against nuclear power in ten demonstrations. In 1977 there was a massive demonstration at the Superphénix breeder reactor in Creys-Malvillein which culminated in violence.

In West Germany, between February 1975 and April 1979, some 280,000 people were involved in seven demonstrations at nuclear sites. Several site occupations were also attempted. Following the Three Mile Island accident in 1979, some 120,000 people attended a demonstration against nuclear power in Bonn.

In the Philippines, there were many protests in the late 1970s and 1980s against the proposed Bataan Nuclear Power Plant, which was built but never operated due to safety concerns and issues regarding corruption.

In 1981, Germany's largest anti-nuclear power demonstration protested against the construction of the Brokdorf Nuclear Power Plant west of Hamburg. Some 100,000 people came face-to-face with 10,000 police officers.

In the late 1970s and early 1980s, the revival of the nuclear arms race triggered a new wave of protests about nuclear weapons. Older organizations such as the Federation of Atomic Scientists revived; newer organizations appeared, including the Nuclear Weapons Freeze Campaign and Physicians for Social Responsibility. In the UK, on 1 April 1983, about 70,000 people linked arms to form a 14-mile-long human chain between three nuclear weapons centres in Berkshire.

On Palm Sunday 1982, 100,000 Australians participated in anti-nuclear rallies in the nation's largest cities. Year by year, the rallies grew, drawing 350,000 participants in 1985. On 29 October 1983, the Committee Cruise Missiles No organised a demonstration in The Hague, Netherlands, which was attended by 550,000 people, and was the largest demonstration in the history of the Netherlands.

In May 1986, following the Chernobyl disaster, clashes between anti-nuclear protesters and West German police were common. More than 400 people were injured in mid-May at demonstrations against the Wackersdorf reprocessing plant (WAA) being built near Wackersdorf. The 5th Anti-WAAhnsinns Festival followed in July. Also in May 1986, an estimated 150,000 to 200,000 people marched in Rome to protest against the Italian nuclear program, and 50,000 marched in Milan. Hundreds of people walked from Los Angeles to Washington, D.C., in 1986 in what is referred to as the Great Peace March for Global Nuclear Disarmament. The march took nine months to traverse 3,700 miles (6,000 km), advancing approximately fifteen miles per day.

The anti-nuclear organisation "Nevada Semipalatinsk" was formed in 1989 and was one of the first major anti-nuclear groups in the former Soviet Union. It attracted thousands of people to its protests and campaigns, which eventually led to the closure of the nuclear test site in north-east Kazakhstan in 1991.

The World Uranium Hearing was held in Salzburg, Austria in September 1992. Anti-nuclear speakers from all continents, including indigenous speakers and scientists, testified to the health and environmental problems of uranium mining and processing, nuclear power, nuclear weapons, nuclear tests, and radioactive waste disposal. People who spoke at the 1992 Hearing included Thomas Banyacya, Katsumi Furitsu, Manuel Pino and Floyd Red Crow Westerman.

=== Protests in the United States ===
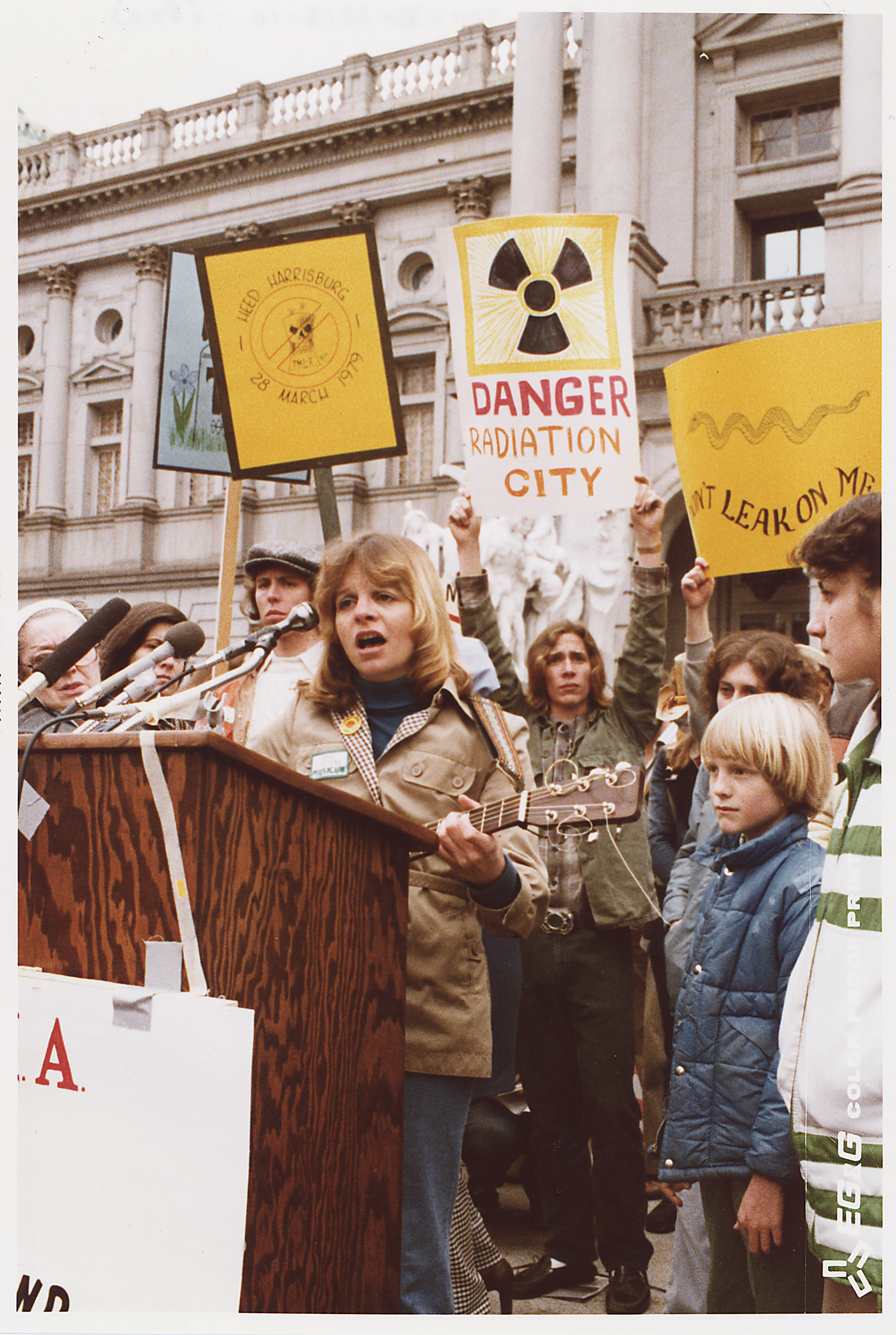
Anti-nuclear protest in 1979 following the Three Mile Island accident

There were many anti-nuclear protests in the United States which captured national public attention during the 1970s and 1980s. These included the well-known Clamshell Alliance protests at Seabrook Station Nuclear Power Plant and the Abalone Alliance protests at Diablo Canyon Nuclear Power Plant, where thousands of protesters were arrested. Other large protests followed the 1979 Three Mile Island accident.

A large anti-nuclear demonstration was held in May 1979 in Washington, D.C., when 65,000 people, including the Governor of California, attended a march and rally against nuclear power. In New York City on 23 September 1979, almost 200,000 people attended a protest against nuclear power. Anti-nuclear power protests preceded the shutdown of the Shoreham, Yankee Rowe, Millstone I, Rancho Seco, Maine Yankee, and about a dozen other nuclear power plants.

On 12 June 1982, one million people demonstrated in New York City's Central Park against nuclear weapons and for an end to the cold war arms race. It was the largest anti-nuclear protest and the largest political demonstration in American history. International Day of Nuclear Disarmament protests were held on 20 June 1983, at 50 sites across the United States. In 1986, hundreds of people walked from Los Angeles to Washington, D.C., in the Great Peace March for Global Nuclear Disarmament. There were many Nevada Desert Experience protests and peace camps at the Nevada Test Site during the 1980s and 1990s.

On 1 May 2005, 40,000 anti-nuclear/anti-war protesters marched past the United Nations in New York, 60 years after the atomic bombings of Hiroshima and Nagasaki. This was the largest anti-nuclear rally in the U.S. for several decades. In the 2000s, there were protests about, and campaigns against, several new nuclear reactor proposals in the United States. In 2013, four aging, uncompetitive, reactors were permanently closed: San Onofre 2 and 3 in California, Crystal River 3 in Florida, and Kewaunee in Wisconsin. Vermont Yankee, in Vernon, is scheduled to close in 2014, following many protests. Protesters in New York State are seeking to close Indian Point Energy Center, in Buchanan, 30 miles from New York City.

=== Recent developments ===
For many years after the 1986 Chernobyl disaster, nuclear power was off the policy agenda in most countries, and the anti-nuclear power movement seemed to have won its case. Some anti-nuclear groups disbanded. In the 2000s (decade), however, following public relations activities by the nuclear industry, advances in nuclear reactor designs, and concerns about climate change, nuclear power issues came back into energy policy discussions in some countries. The Fukushima Daiichi nuclear disaster subsequently undermined the nuclear power industry's proposed comeback.

2004–2006

In January 2004, up to 15,000 anti-nuclear protesters marched in Paris against a new generation of nuclear reactors, the European Pressurised Water Reactor (EPWR).

On 1 May 2005, 40,000 anti-nuclear/anti-war protesters marched past the United Nations in New York, 60 years after the atomic bombings of Hiroshima and Nagasaki. This was the largest anti-nuclear rally in the U.S. for several decades. In Britain, there were many protests about the government's proposal to replace the aging Trident weapons system with a newer model. The largest protest had 100,000 participants and, according to polls, 59 per cent of the public opposed the move.

2007–2009

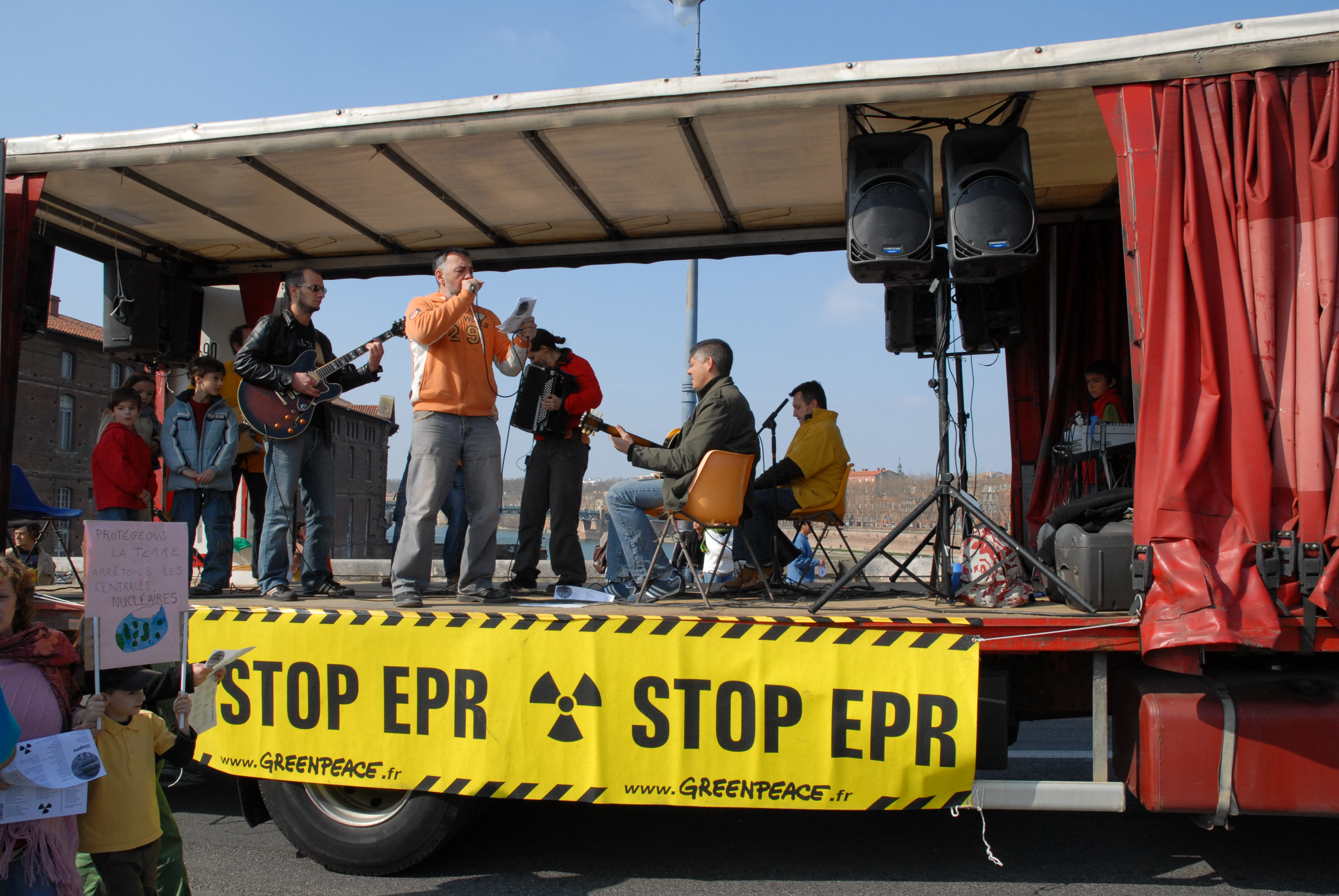
A scene from the 2007 Stop EPR (European Pressurised Reactor) protest in Toulouse, France

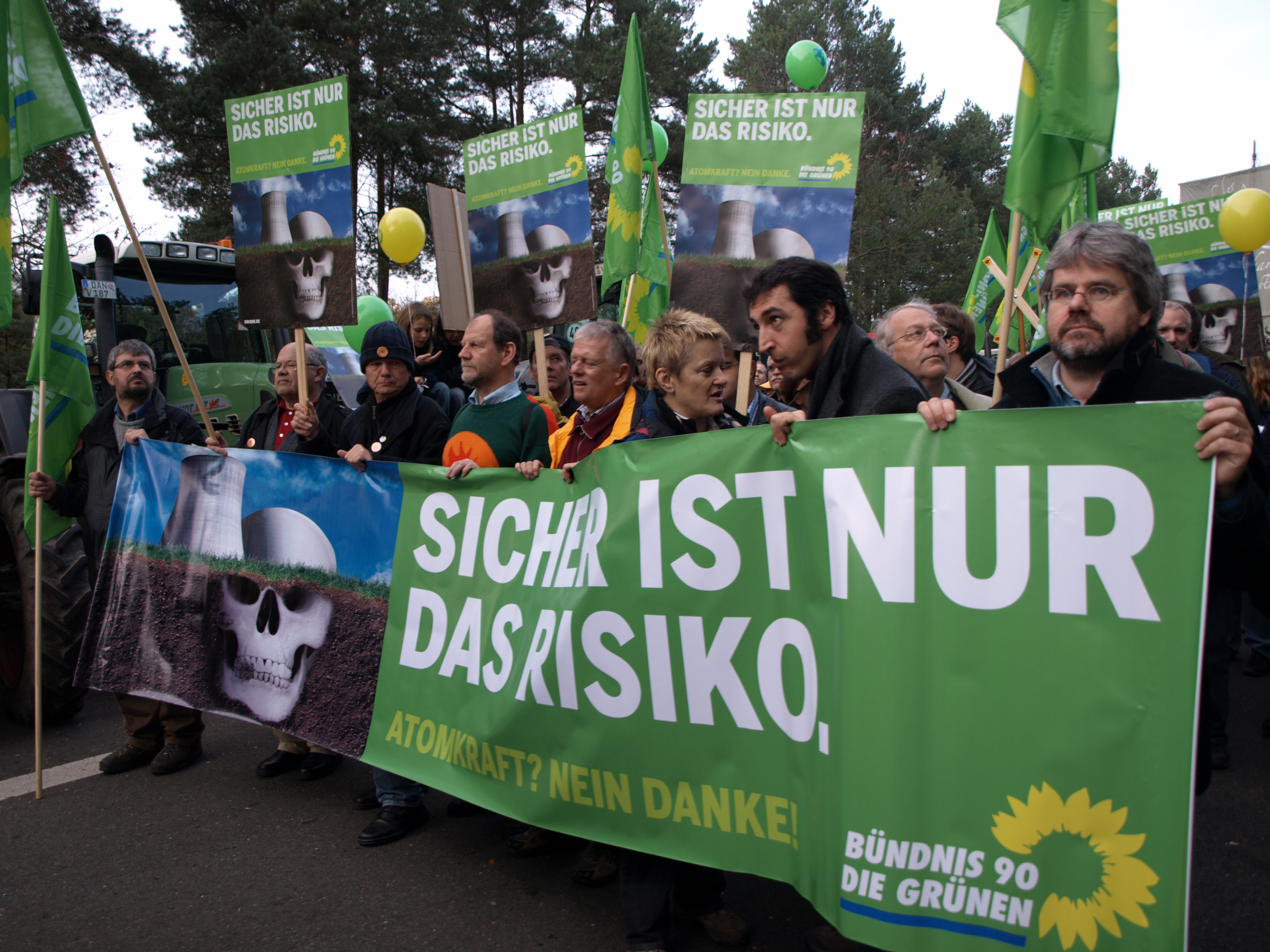
Anti-nuclear protest near nuclear waste disposal centre at Gorleben in Northern Germany, on 8 November 2008

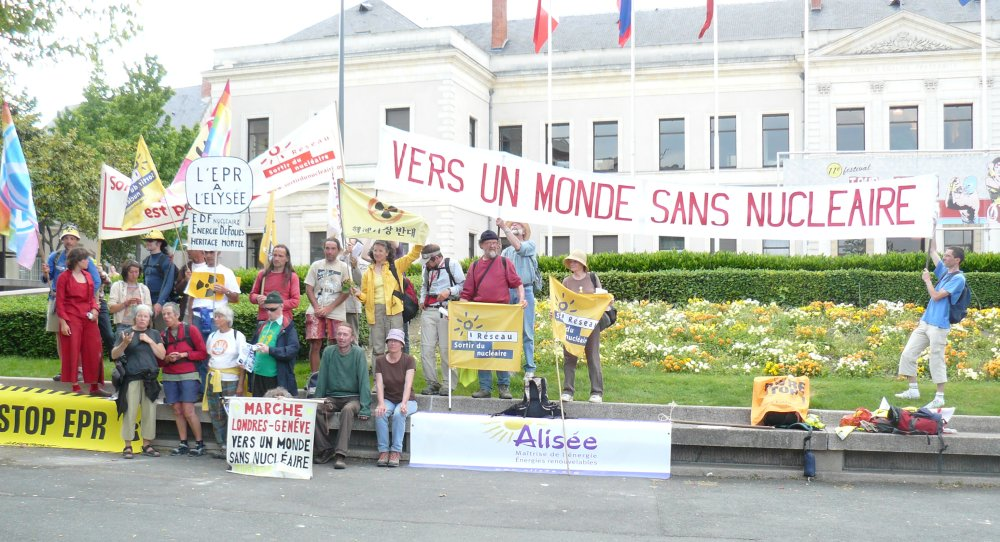
Anti-nuclear march from London to Geneva, 2008

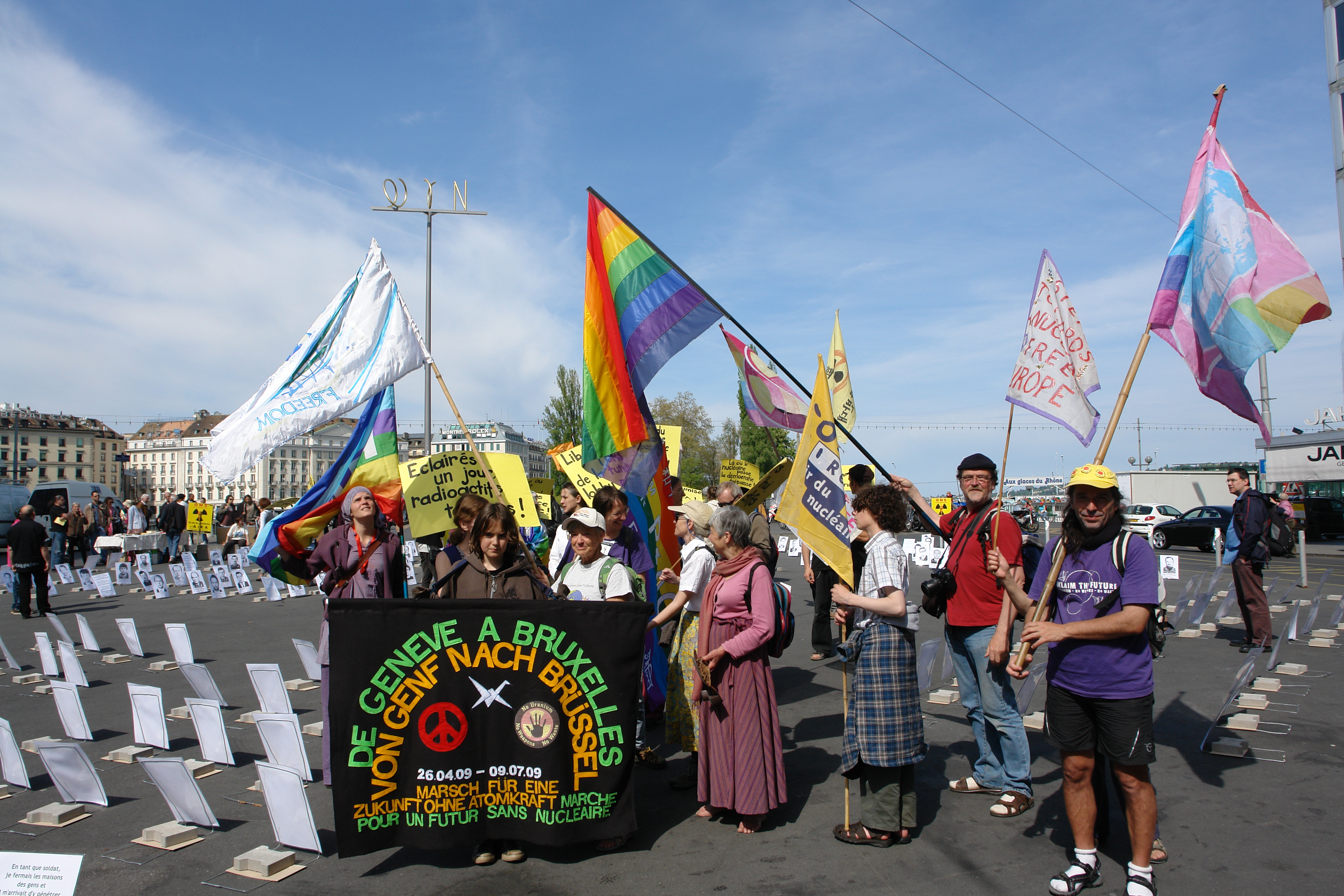
Start of anti-nuclear march from Geneva to Brussels, 2009

On 17 March 2007, simultaneous protests, organised by Sortir du nucléaire, were staged in five French towns to protest construction of EPR plants; Rennes, Lyon, Toulouse, Lille, and Strasbourg.

In June 2007, 4,000 residents, students, and anti-nuclear activists took to the streets in the city of Kudus in Indonesia's Central Java, calling on the Government to abandon plans to build a nuclear power plant there.

In February 2008, a group of concerned scientists and engineers called for the closure of the Kazantzakis-Kariwa Nuclear Power Plant in Japan.

The International Conference on Nuclear Disarmament took place in Oslo in February 2008. The Government of Norway, the Nuclear Threat Initiative, and the Hoover Institute organized it. The Conference was entitled Achieving the Vision of a World Free of Nuclear Weapons and had the purpose of building consensus between nuclear weapon states and non-nuclear weapon states in relation to the Nuclear Non-proliferation Treaty.

During a weekend in October 2008, some 15,000 people disrupted the transport of radioactive nuclear waste from France to a dump in Germany. This was one of the largest such protests in many years and, according to Der Spiel, it signals a revival of the anti-nuclear movement in Germany. In 2009, the coalition of green parties in the European parliament, who are unanimous in their anti-nuclear position, increased their presence in the parliament from 5.5% to 7.1% (52 seats).

In October 2008, in the United Kingdom, more than 30 people were arrested during one of the largest anti-nuclear protests at the Atomic Weapons Establishment at Aldermaston for 10 years. The demonstration marked the start of the UN World Disarmament Week and involved about 400 people.

In 2008 and 2009, there have been protests about, and criticism of, several new nuclear reactor proposals in the United States. There have also been some objections to license renewals for existing nuclear plants.

A convoy of 350 farm tractors and 50,000 protesters took part in an anti-nuclear rally in Berlin on 5 September 2009. The marchers demanded that Germany close all nuclear plants by 2020 and close the Gorleben radioactive dump. Gorleben is the focus of the anti-nuclear movement in Germany, which has tried to derail train transports of waste and to destroy or block the approach roads to the site. Two above-ground storage units house 3,500 containers of radioactive sludge and thousands of tonnes of spent fuel rods.

2010

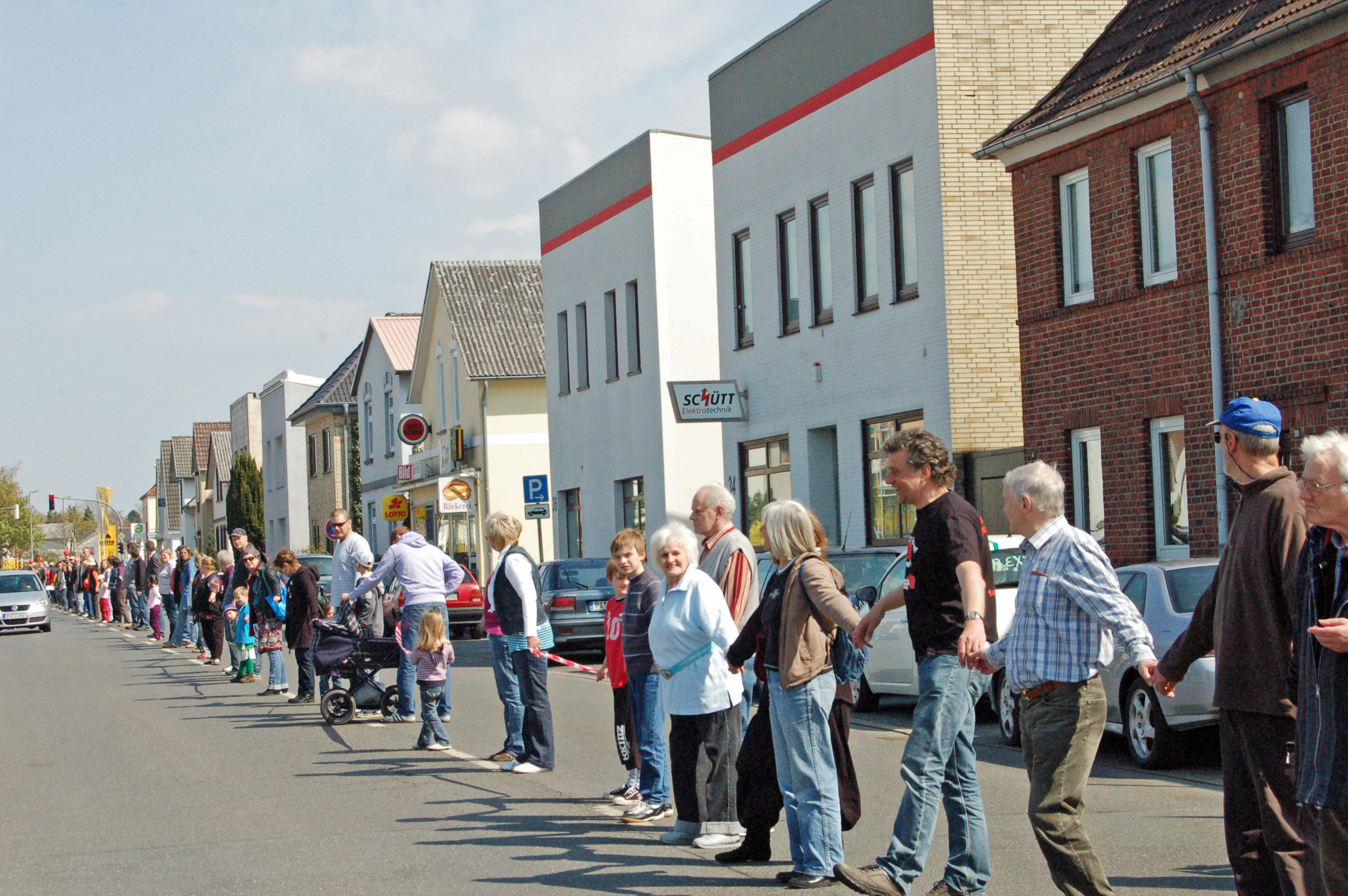
KETTENreAKTION! in Uetersen, Germany

On 21 April 2010, a dozen environmental organizations called on the United States Nuclear Regulatory Commission to investigate possible limitations in the AP1000 reactor design. These groups appealed to three federal agencies to suspend the licensing process, arguing that containment in the new design is weaker than in existing reactors.

On 24 April 2010, about 120,000 people built a human chain (KETTENreAKTION!) between the nuclear plants at Krümmel and Brunsbüttel. In this way, they were demonstrating against the German government's plans to extend the lifespans of nuclear power reactors.

In May 2010, some 25,000 people, including members of peace organizations and 1945 atomic bomb survivors, marched for about two kilometers from downtown New York to the United Nations headquarters, calling for the elimination of nuclear weapons. In September 2010, German government policy shifted back toward nuclear energy, and this generated some new anti-nuclear sentiment in Berlin and beyond. On 18 September 2010, tens of thousands of Germans surrounded Chancellor Angela Merkel's office in an anti-nuclear demonstration that organisers said was the biggest of its kind since the 1986 Chernobyl disaster. In October 2010, tens of thousands of people protested in Munich against the nuclear power policy of Angela Merkel's coalition government. The action was the largest anti-nuclear event in Bavaria for more than two decades. In November 2010, there were violent protests against a train carrying reprocessed nuclear waste in Germany. Tens of thousands of protesters gathered in Dannenberg to signal their opposition to the cargo. Around 16,000 police were mobilised to deal with the protests.

In December 2010, some 10,000 people (mainly fishermen, farmers, and their families) turned out to oppose the Jaitapur Nuclear Power Project in the Maharashtra state of India, amid a heavy police presence.

In December 2010, five anti-nuclear weapons activists, including octogenarians and Jesuit priests, were convicted of conspiracy and trespass in Tacoma, US. They cut fences at Naval Base Kitsap-Bangor in 2009 to protest submarine nuclear weapons, and reached an area near where Trident nuclear warheads are stored in bunkers. Members of the group could face up to 10 years in prison.

2011

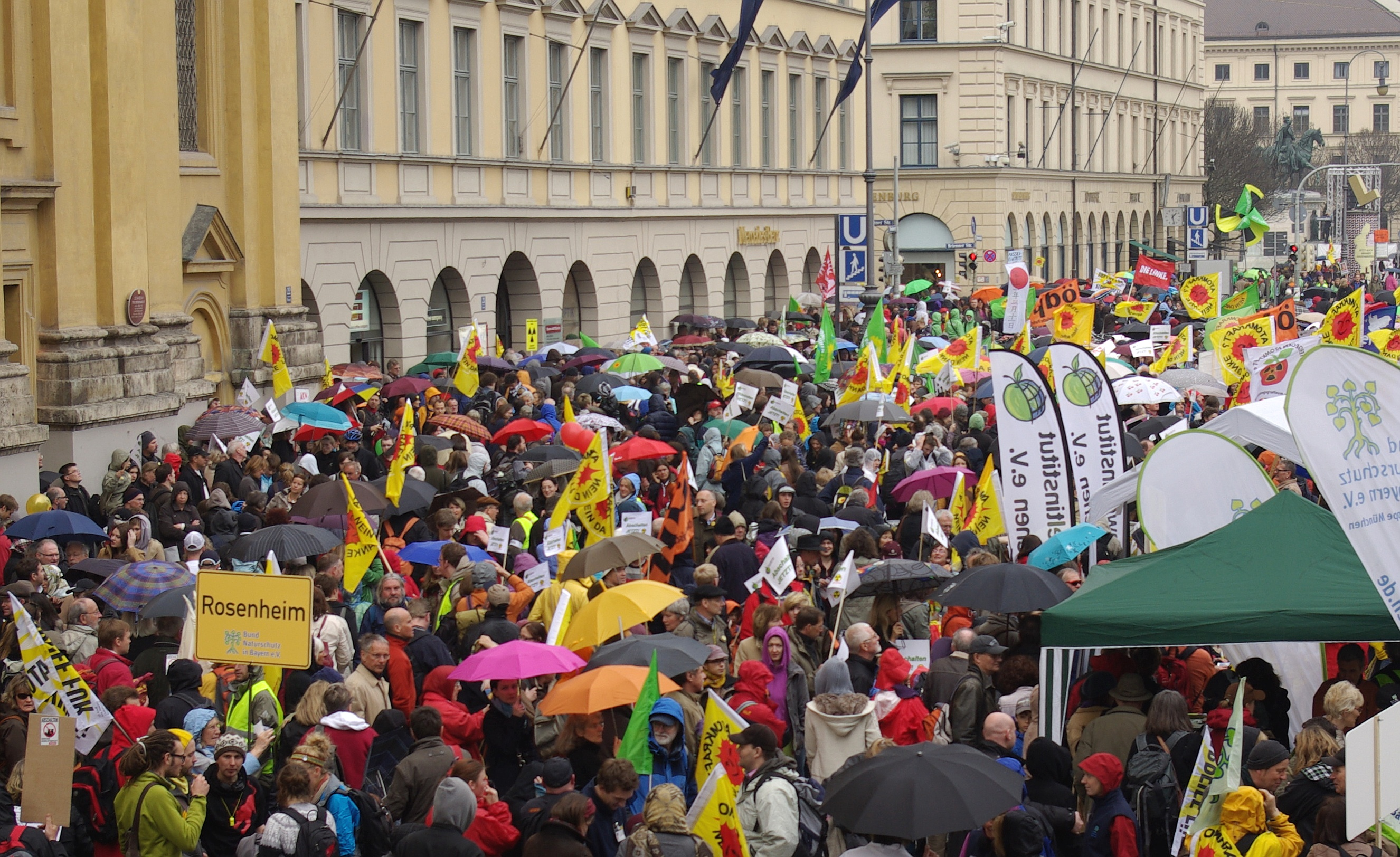
Anti-nuclear demonstration in Munich, Germany, March 2011

Eight of the seventeen operating reactors in Germany were permanently shut down following the March 2011 Fukushima nuclear disaster

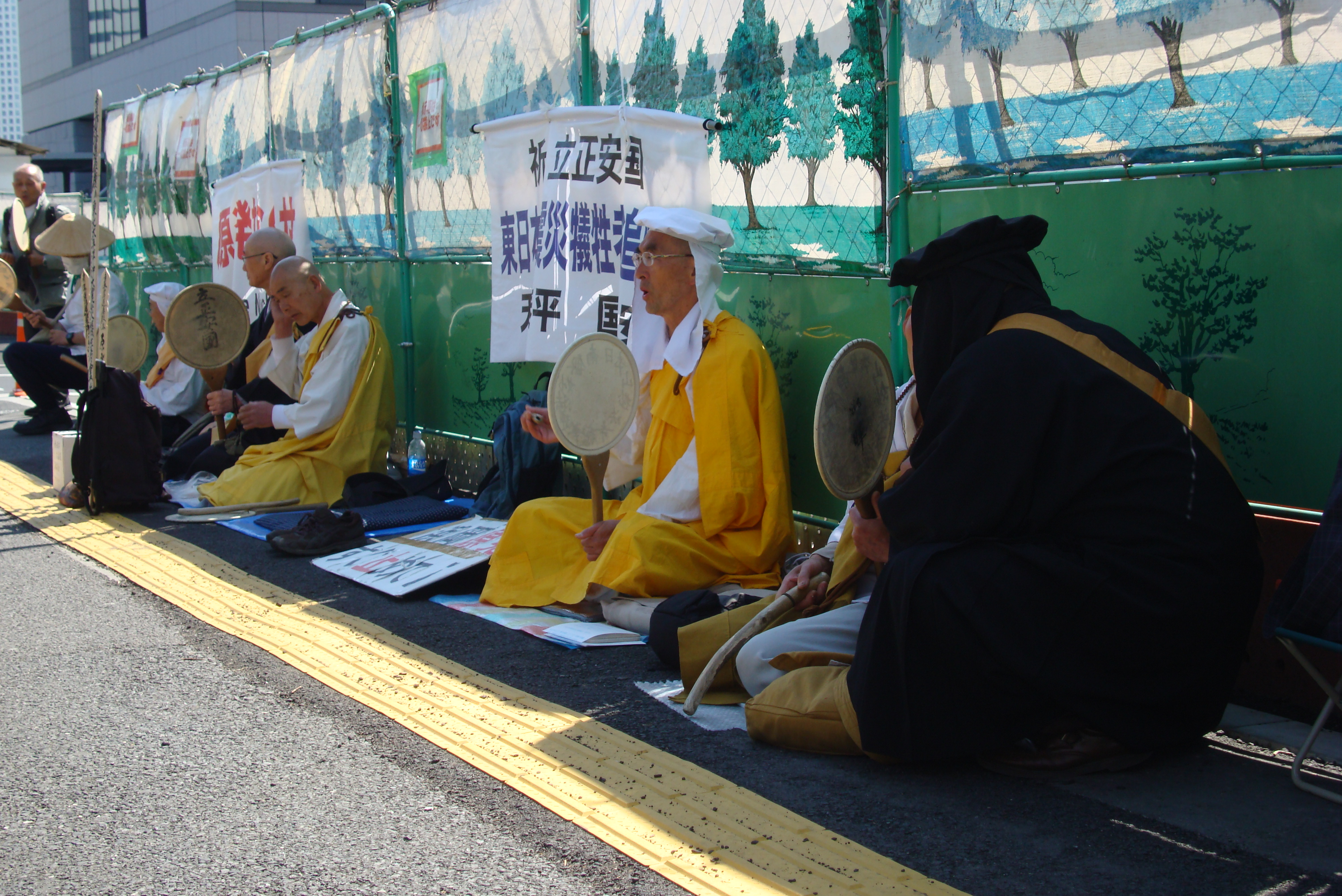
Buddhist monks of Nipponzan-Myōhōji protest against nuclear power near the Diet of Japan in Tokyo on 5 April 2011.

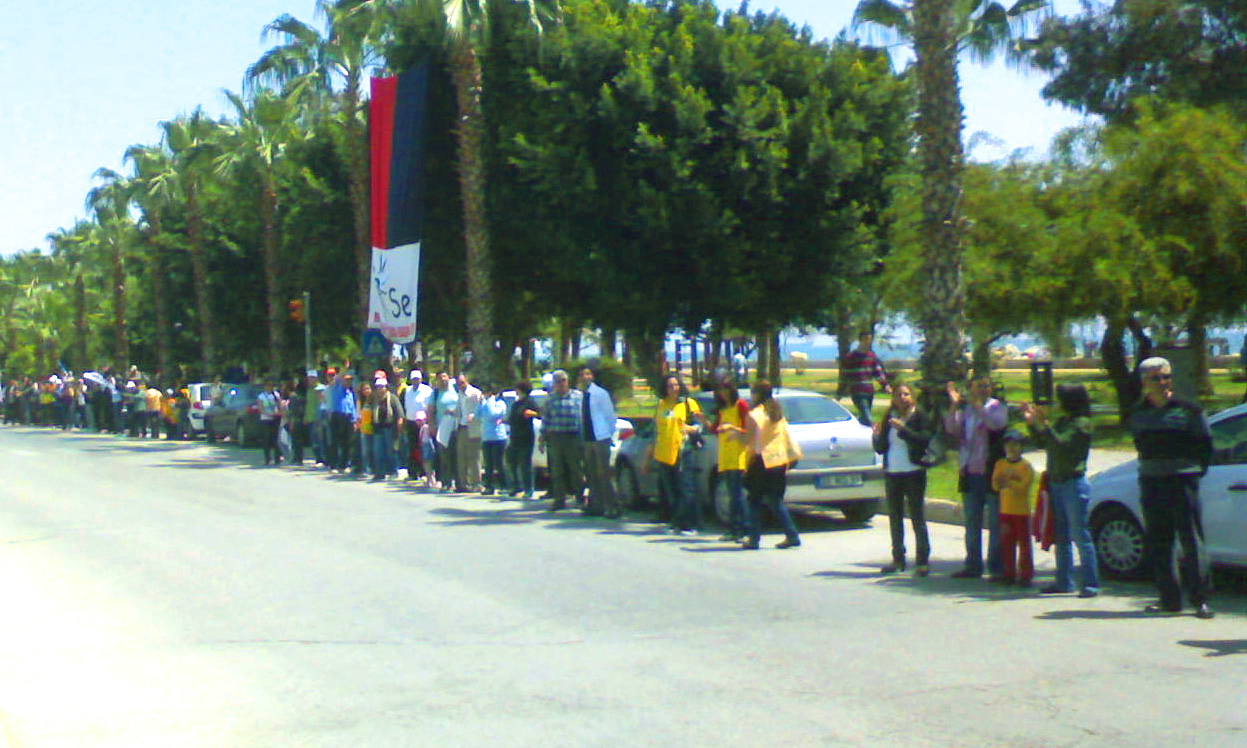
Human chain against nuclear plant in Turkey on 17 April 2011

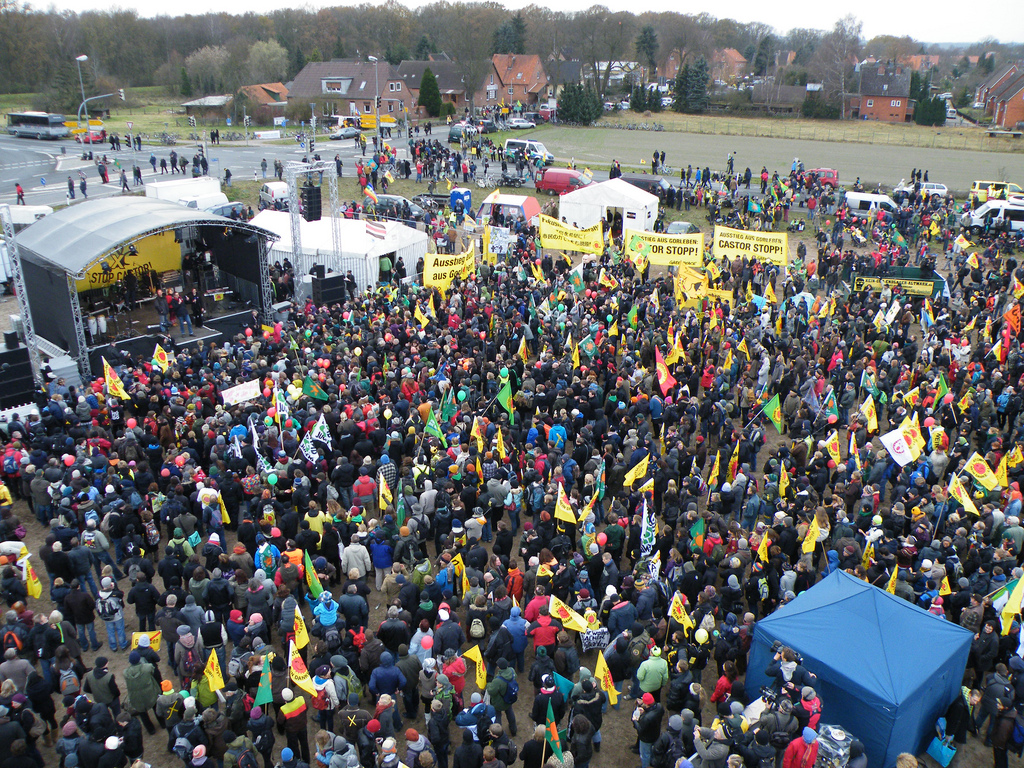
Castor demonstration in Dannenberg, Germany, November 2011

In January 2011, five Japanese young people held a hunger strike for more than a week, outside the Prefectural Government offices in Yamaguchi City, to protest against the planned Kaminoseki Nuclear Power Plant near the environmentally sensitive Seto Inland Sea.

Following the Fukushima Daiichi nuclear disaster, anti-nuclear opposition intensified in Germany. On 12 March 2011, 60,000 Germans formed a 45-km human chain from Stuttgart to the Neckarwestheim power plant. On 14 March 110,000 people protested in 450 other German towns, with opinion polls indicating 80% of Germans opposed the government's extension of nuclear power. On 15 March 2011, Angela Merkel said that seven nuclear power plants which went online before 1980 would be closed and the time would be used to study speedier renewable energy commercialization.

In March 2011, around 2,000 anti-nuclear protesters demonstrated in Taiwan for an immediate halt to the construction of the island's fourth nuclear power plant. The protesters were also opposed to plans to extend the lifespan of three existing nuclear plants.

In March 2011, more than 200,000 people took part in anti-nuclear protests in four large German cities, on the eve of state elections. Organisers called it the largest anti-nuclear demonstration the country has seen. Thousands of Germans demanding an end to the use of nuclear power took part in nationwide demonstrations on 2 April 2011. About 7,000 people took part in anti-nuclear protests in Bremen. About 3,000 people protested outside RWE's headquarters in Essen.

Citing the Fukushima nuclear disaster, environmental activists at a U.N. meeting in April 2011 "urged bolder steps to tap renewable energy so the world doesn't have to choose between the dangers of nuclear power and the ravages of climate change".

In mid-April, 17,000 people protested at two demonstrations in Tokyo against nuclear power.

In India, environmentalists, local farmers and fishermen have been protesting for months over the planned Jaitapur Nuclear Power Project six-reactor complex, 420 km south of Mumbai. If built, it would be one of the world's largest nuclear power complexes. Protests have escalated following Japan's Fukushima nuclear disaster, and during two days of violent rallies in April 2011, a local man was killed, and dozens were injured.

In May 2011, some 20,000 people turned out for Switzerland's largest anti-nuclear power demonstration in 25 years. Demonstrators marched peacefully near the Beznau Nuclear Power Plant, Switzerland's oldest nuclear power plant, which began operating 40 years ago. Days after the anti-nuclear rally, Cabinet decided to ban the building of new nuclear power reactors. The country's five existing reactors would be allowed to continue operating, but "would not be replaced at the end of their life span".

In May 2011, 5,000 people joined a carnival-like anti-nuclear protest in Taipei City. This was part of a nationwide "No Nuke Action" protest, urging the government to stop construction of a Fourth Nuclear Plant and pursue a more sustainable energy policy.

On World Environment Day in June 2011, environmental groups demonstrated against Taiwan's nuclear power policy. The Taiwan Environmental Protection Union, together with 13 environmental groups and legislators, gathered in Taipei to protest the nation's three operating nuclear power plants and the construction of a fourth.

Three months after the Fukushima nuclear disaster, thousands of anti-nuclear protesters marched in Japan. Company workers, students, and parents with children rallied across Japan, "venting their anger at the government's handling of the crisis, carrying flags bearing the words 'No Nukes!' and 'No More Fukushima'."

In August 2011, about 2,500 people, including farmers and fishermen, marched in Tokyo. They are suffering heavy losses following the Fukushima nuclear disaster and have called for prompt compensation from the plant operator, TEPCO, and the government.

In September 2011, anti-nuclear protesters, marching to the beat of drums, "took to the streets of Tokyo and other cities to mark six months since the March earthquake and tsunami and vent their anger at the government's handling of the nuclear crisis set off by meltdowns at the Fukushima power plant". Protesters called for a complete shutdown of Japanese nuclear power plants and demanded a shift in government policy toward alternative sources of energy. Among the protestors were four young men who started a 10-day hunger strike to bring about change in Japan's nuclear policy.

Tens of thousands of people marched in central Tokyo in September 2011, chanting "Sayonara nuclear power" and waving banners, to call on Japan's government to abandon atomic energy in the wake of the Fukushima nuclear disaster. Author Kenzaburō Ōe and musician Ryuichi Sakamoto were among the event's supporters.

Since the March 2011 Japanese Fukushima nuclear disaster, "populations around proposed Indian NPP sites have launched protests that are now finding resonance around the country, raising questions about atomic energy as a clean and safe alternative to fossil fuels". Assurances by Prime Minister Manmohan Singh that all safety measures will be implemented, have not been heeded. There have thus been mass protests against the French-backed 9900 MW Jaitapur Nuclear Power Project in Maharashtra and the 2000 MW Koodankulam Nuclear Power Plant in Tamil Nadu. The state government of West Bengal has also refused permission for a proposed 6,000 MW facility in which six Russian reactors were to be built. A Public Interest Litigation (PIL) has also been filed against the government's civil nuclear program at the apex Supreme Court. The PIL specifically asks for the "staying of all proposed nuclear power plants till satisfactory safety measures and cost-benefit analyses are completed by independent agencies".

Michael Banach, the current Vatican representative to the International Atomic Energy Agency, told a conference in Vienna in September 2011 that the Japanese nuclear disaster created new concerns about the safety of nuclear plants globally. Auxiliary bishop of Osaka Michael Goro Matsuura said this serious nuclear power incident should be a lesson for Japan and other countries to abandon nuclear projects. He called on the worldwide Christian solidarity to provide wide support for this anti-nuclear campaign. Statements from bishops' conferences in Korea and the Philippines called on their governments to abandon atomic power. Nobel laureate Kenzaburō Ōe has said that Japan should quickly decide to abandon its nuclear reactors.

In the UK, in October 2011, more than 200 protesters blockaded the Hinkley Point C nuclear power station site. Members of the Stop New Nuclear alliance barred access to the site in protest of EDF Energy's plans to build two new reactors there.

2012

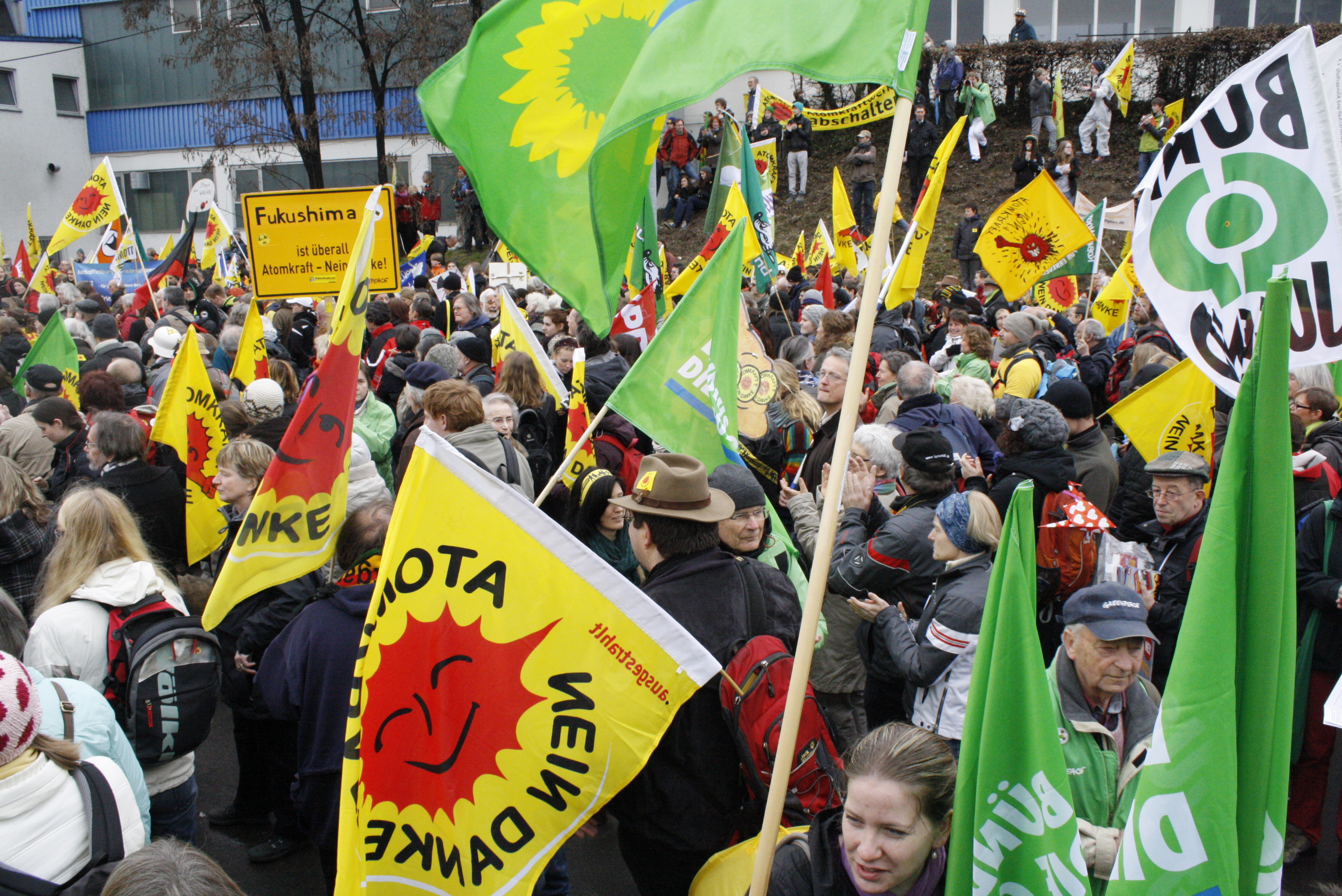
Protest at Neckarwestheim, Germany, 11 March 2012

In January 2012, 22 South Korean women's groups appealed for a nuclear-free future, saying they believe nuclear weapons and power reactors "threaten our lives, the lives of our families and all living creatures". The women said they feel an enormous sense of crisis after the Fukushima nuclear disaster in March 2011, which demonstrated the destructive power of radiation in the disruption of human lives, environmental pollution, and food contamination.

Thousands of demonstrators took to the streets of Yokohama, Japan, on 14–15 January 2012, to show their support for a nuclear power-free world. The demonstration showed that organized opposition to nuclear power has gained momentum following the Fukushima nuclear disaster. The most immediate demand of the demonstrators was for the protection of rights, including basic human rights such as health care, for those affected by the Fukushima accident.

In January 2012, three hundred anti-nuclear protestors marched against plans to build a new nuclear power station at Wylfa in the UK. The march was organised by Pobl Atal Wylfa B, Greenpeace, and Cymdeithas yr Iaith, which are supporting a farmer who is in dispute with Horizon.

On the anniversary of the 11 March earthquake and tsunami, protesters across Japan called for the abolition of nuclear power and nuclear reactors. In Koriyama, Fukushima, 16,000 people called for the end of nuclear power. In Shizuoka Prefecture, 1,100 people appealed for the scrapping of the Hamaoka Nuclear Power Plant. In Tsuruga, Fukui, 1,200 people marched in the streets of the city of Tsuruga, the home of the Monju fast-breeder reactor prototype and other nuclear reactors. In Nagasaki and Hiroshima, anti-nuclear protesters and atomic-bomb survivors marched together and demanded that Japan end its nuclear dependency.

Austrian Chancellor Werner Faymann expects anti-nuclear petition drives to start in at least six European Union countries in 2012 in an effort to have the EU abandon nuclear power. Under the EU's Lisbon Treaty, petitions that attract at least one million signatures can prompt the European Commission to propose legislation, paving the way for anti-nuclear activists to garner support.

In March 2012, about 2,000 people staged an anti-nuclear protest in Taiwan's capital following the massive tsunami that hit Japan one year ago. The protesters rallied in Taipei to renew calls for a nuclear-free island. They "want the government to scrap a plan to operate a newly constructed nuclear power plant – the fourth in densely populated Taiwan". Scores of aboriginal protesters "demanded the removal of 100,000 barrels of nuclear waste stored on their Orchid Island".

In March 2012, hundreds of anti-nuclear demonstrators converged on the Australian headquarters of global mining giants BHP Billiton and Rio Tinto. The 500-strong march through southern Melbourne called for an end to uranium mining in Australia. It included speeches and performances by representatives of the expatriate Japanese community as well as Australia's Indigenous communities, who are concerned about the effects of uranium mining near tribal lands. There were also events in Sydney.

In March 2012, South Korean environmental groups held a rally in Seoul to oppose nuclear power. Over 5,000 people attended, and the turnout was one of the largest in recent memory for an anti-nuclear rally. The demonstration demanded that President Lee Myung-bak abandon his policy of promoting nuclear power.

In March 2012, police said they had arrested nearly 200 anti-nuclear activists who were protesting the restart of work at the long-stalled Indian Kudankulam nuclear power plant.

In June 2012, tens of thousands of Japanese protesters participated in anti-nuclear power rallies in Tokyo and Osaka, over the government's decision to restart the first idled reactors since the Fukushima disaster, at Oi Nuclear Power Plant in Fukui Prefecture.

2013

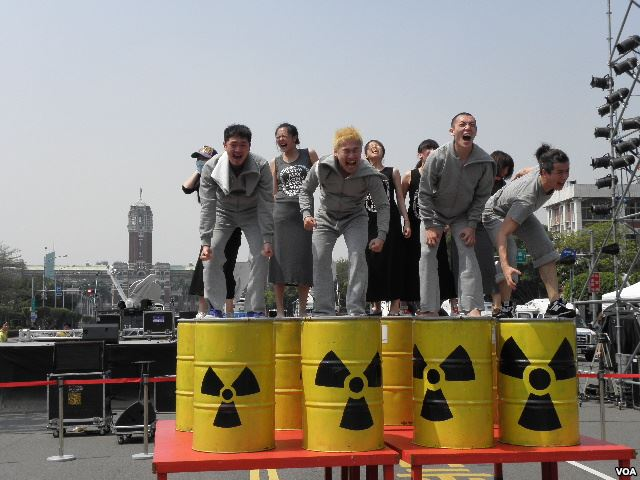
Anti-nuclear protesters in Taipei

Thousands of protesters marched in Tokyo on 11 March 2013, calling on the government to reject nuclear power.

In March 2013, 68,000 Taiwanese protested across major cities against nuclear power and the island's fourth nuclear plant, which is under construction. Taiwan's three existing nuclear plants are near the ocean and prone to geological fractures under the island.

In April 2013, thousands of Scottish campaigners, MSPs, and union leaders rallied against nuclear weapons. The Scrap Trident Coalition wants to see an end to nuclear weapons and says saved money should be used for health, education, and welfare initiatives. There was also a blockade of the Faslane Naval Base, where Trident missiles are stored.

2014

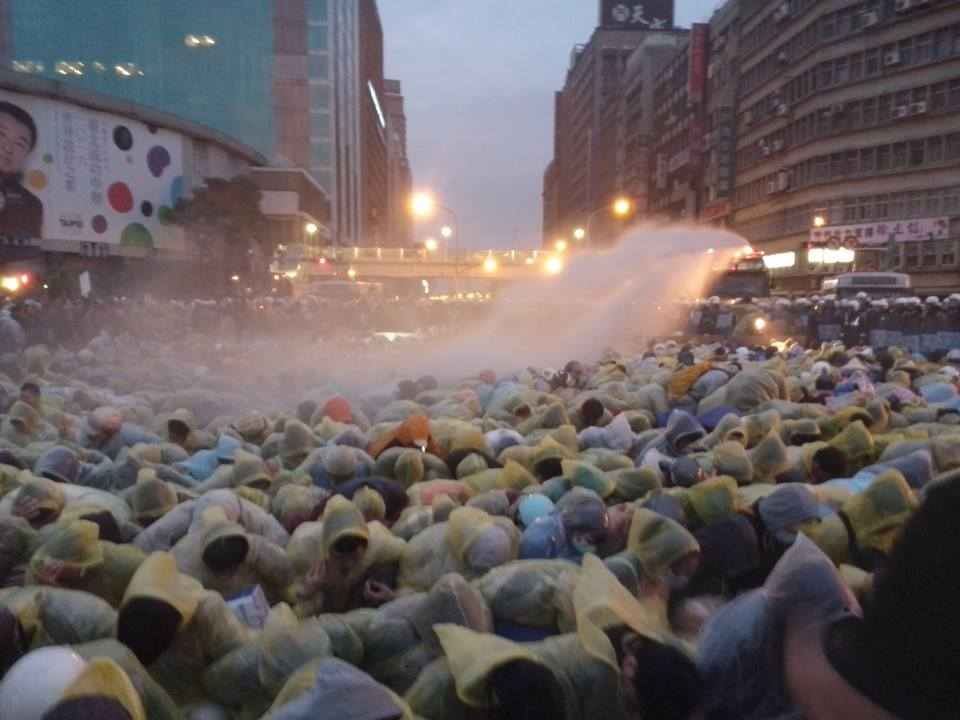
Anti-nuclear protesters shot with water cannons in Taiwan

In March 2014, around 130,000 Taiwanese marched in an anti-nuclear protest around Taiwan. They demanded that the government remove nuclear power plants in Taiwan. The march came ahead of the 3rd anniversary of the Fukushima disaster. Around 50,000 people marched in Taipei, while three separate events were held in other Taiwanese cities, each attended by around 30,000 people. Among the participants are the organizations from Green Citizen Action's Alliance, Homemakers United Foundation, Taiwan Association for Human Rights and Taiwan Environmental Protection Union. Facing ongoing opposition and a host of delays, construction of the Lungmen Nuclear Power Plant was halted in April 2014.

=== Casualties ===
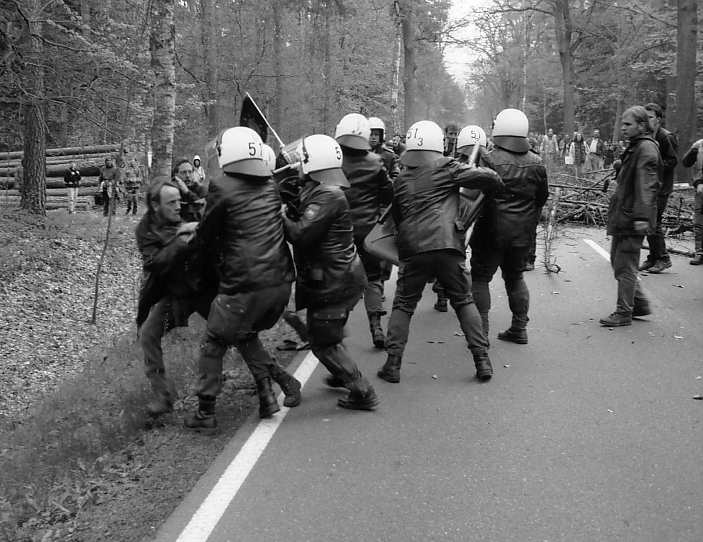
Anti-nuclear demonstrations near Gorleben, Lower Saxony, Germany, 8 May 1996

Casualties during anti-nuclear protests include:

- On 9 December 1982, Norman Mayer, an American anti–nuclear weapons activist, was shot and killed by the United States Park Police after threatening to blow up the Washington Monument, Washington, D.C., unless a national dialogue on the threat of nuclear weapons was seriously undertaken.
- On 10 July 1985, the flagship of Greenpeace, Rainbow Warrior, was sunk by France in New Zealand waters, and a Greenpeace photographer was killed. The ship was involved in protests against nuclear weapons testing at Mururoa Atoll. The French Government initially denied any involvement with the sinking but eventually admitted its guilt in October 1985. Two French agents pleaded guilty to charges of manslaughter, and the French Government paid $7 million in damages.
- In 1990, two pylons holding high-voltage power lines connecting the French and Italian grid were blown up by Italian eco-terrorists, and the attack is believed to have been directly in opposition to the Superphénix.
- In 2004, activist Sébastien Briat, who had tied himself to train tracks in front of a shipment of reprocessed nuclear waste, was run over by the wheels of the train. The event occurred in Avricourt, France, and the fuel (12 containers in total) was from a German plant, en route for reprocessing.

== Impact ==
=== Impact on popular culture ===
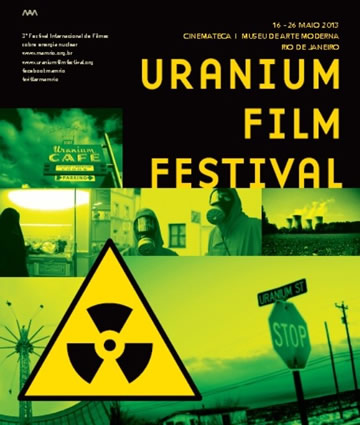
Montage of film stills from the International Uranium Film Festival

Beginning in the 1950s, anti-nuclear ideas received coverage in the popular media with novels such as Fail-Safe and feature films such as Godzilla (1954), Dr. Strangelove or: How I Learned to Stop Worrying and Love the Bomb (1964), The China Syndrome (1979), Silkwood (1983), and The Rainbow Warrior (1992).

Dr. Strangelove explored "what might happen within the Pentagon ... if some maniac Air Force general should suddenly order a nuclear attack on the Soviet Union". One reviewer called the movie "one of the cleverest and most incisive satiric thrusts at the awkwardness and folly of the military that has ever been on the screen".

The China Syndrome has been described as a "gripping 1979 drama about the dangers of nuclear power", and it had added impact when the Three Mile Island accident occurred several weeks after the film opened. Jane Fonda plays a TV reporter who witnesses a near-meltdown (the "China syndrome" of the title) at a local nuclear plant, which was averted by a quick-thinking engineer, played by Jack Lemmon. The plot suggests that corporate greed and cost-cutting "have led to potentially deadly faults in the plant's construction".

Silkwood was inspired by the true-life story of Karen Silkwood, who died in a suspicious car accident while investigating alleged wrongdoing at the Kerr-McGee plutonium plant where she worked.

Dark Circle is a 1982 American documentary film that focuses on the connections between the nuclear weapons and the nuclear power industries, with a strong emphasis on the individual human and protracted U.S. environmental costs involved. A clear point made by the film is that while only two bombs were dropped on Japan, many hundreds were exploded in the United States. The film won the Grand Prize for documentary at the Sundance Film Festival and received a national Emmy Award for "Outstanding individual achievement in news and documentary." For the opening scenes and about half of its length, the film focuses on the Rocky Flats Plant and its plutonium contamination of the area's environment.

Ashes to Honey (ミツバチの羽音と地球の回転, Mitsubashi no haoto to chikyū no kaiten), (literally "Humming of Bees and Rotation of the Earth") is a Japanese documentary directed by Hitomi Kamanaka and released in 2010. It is the third in Kamanaka's trilogy of films on the problems of nuclear power and radiation, preceded by Hibakusha at the End of the World (also known as Radiation: A Slow Death) and Rokkasho Rhapsody.

Nuclear Tipping Point is a 2010 documentary film produced by the Nuclear Threat Initiative. It features interviews with four American government officials who were in office during the Cold War but now advocate for the elimination of nuclear weapons. They are: Henry Kissinger, George Shultz, Sam Nunn, and William Perry.

Musicians United for Safe Energy (MUSE) was a musical group founded in 1979 by Jackson Browne, Graham Nash, Bonnie Raitt, and John Hall, following the Three Mile Island nuclear accident. The group organized a series of five No Nukes concerts held at Madison Square Garden in New York City in September 1979. On 23 September 1979, almost 200,000 people attended a large anti-nuclear rally staged by MUSE on the then-empty north end of the Battery Park City landfill in New York. The album No Nukes, and a film, also titled No Nukes, were both released in 1980 to document the performances.

In 2007, Bonnie Raitt, Graham Nash, and Jackson Browne, as part of the No Nukes group, recorded a music video of the Buffalo Springfield song "For What It's Worth".

Filmmakers Taylor Dunne and Eric Stewart are working on a documentary called "Off Country" that looks at the devastating effects of atomic bomb testing on the communities around the White Sands missile range in New Mexico, the Nevada Test Site, and the Rocky Flats Plant in Colorado. They were interviewed by Screen Comment's Sam Weisberg in 2017.

=== Impact on policy ===
U.S. and USSR/Russian nuclear weapons stockpiles, 1945–2005

The Bulletin of the Atomic Scientists is a nontechnical online magazine that has been published continuously since 1945, when it was founded by former Manhattan Project physicists after the atomic bombings of Hiroshima and Nagasaki. The Bulletin's primary aim is to inform the public about nuclear policy debates while advocating for the international control of nuclear weapons. One of the driving forces behind the creation of the Bulletin was the public interest in atomic energy at the dawn of the atomic age. In 1945 the public interest in atomic warfare and weaponry inspired contributors to the Bulletin to attempt to inform those interested about the dangers and destruction that atomic war could bring about. In the 1950s, the Bulletin was involved in the formation of the Pugwash Conferences on Science and World Affairs, annual conferences of scientists concerned about nuclear proliferation.

Historian Lawrence S. Wittner has argued that anti-nuclear sentiment and activism led directly to government policy shifts about nuclear weapons. Public opinion influenced policymakers by limiting their options and forcing them to choose certain policies over others. Wittner credits public pressure and anti-nuclear activism with "Truman's decision to explore the Baruch Plan, Eisenhower's efforts towards a nuclear test ban and the 1958 testing moratorium, and Kennedy's signing of the Partial Test Ban Treaty".

In terms of nuclear power, Forbes magazine, in the September 1975 issue, reported that "the anti-nuclear coalition has been remarkably successful ... [and] has certainly slowed the expansion of nuclear power." California has banned the approval of new nuclear reactors since the late 1970s because of concerns over waste disposal, and some other U.S. states have a moratorium on construction of nuclear power plants. Between 1975 and 1980, a total of 63 nuclear units were canceled in the United States. Anti-nuclear activities were among the reasons, but the primary motivations were the overestimation of future electricity demand and steadily rising capital costs, which made the economics of new plants unfavorable.

The proliferation of nuclear weapons became a presidential priority issue for the Carter Administration in the late 1970s. To deal with proliferation problems, President Carter promoted stronger international control over nuclear technology, including nuclear reactor technology. Although a strong supporter of nuclear power generally, Carter turned against the breeder reactor because the plutonium it produced could be diverted into nuclear weapons.

For many years after the 1986 Chernobyl disaster, nuclear power was off the policy agenda in most countries. In recent years, intense public relations activities by the nuclear industry, increasing evidence of climate change and failures to address it, have brought nuclear power issues back to the forefront of policy discussion in the nuclear renaissance countries. But some countries are not prepared to expand nuclear power and are still divesting themselves of their nuclear legacy, through nuclear power phase-out legislation.

Under the New Zealand Nuclear Free Zone, Disarmament, and Arms Control Act 1987, all territorial sea and land of New Zealand is declared a nuclear free zone. Nuclear-powered and nuclear-armed ships are prohibited from entering the country's territorial waters. Dumping of foreign radioactive waste and development of nuclear weapons in the country are outlawed. This followed a decades-long campaign by peace activists, which included disrupting US warship visits. Despite common misconception, this act does not make nuclear power plants illegal, nor does it make radioactive medical treatments produced in overseas reactors illegal. A 2008 survey shows that 19% of New Zealanders favour nuclear power as the best energy source, while 77% prefer wind power as the best energy source.

On 26 February 1990, FW de Klerk issued orders to terminate the country's nuclear weapons programme, which until then had been a state secret. South Africa becomes the first country in the world to voluntary give-up its nuclear weapons programme.

UN vote on adoption of the Treaty on the Prohibition of Nuclear Weapons on 7 July 2017 Yes No Did not vote

Ireland, in 1999, had no plans to change its non-nuclear stance and pursue nuclear power in the future.

In the United States, the Navajo Nation forbids uranium mining and processing in its land.

In the United States, a 2007 University of Maryland survey showed that 73 per cent of the public surveyed favours the elimination of all nuclear weapons, 64 per cent support removing all nuclear weapons from high alert, and 59 per cent support reducing U.S. and Russian nuclear stockpiles to 400 weapons each. Given the unpopularity of nuclear weapons, U.S. politicians have been wary of supporting new nuclear programs. Republican-dominated congresses "have defeated the Bush administration's plan to build so-called 'bunker-busters' and 'mini-nukes'."

The Megatons to Megawatts Program converts weapons-grade material from nuclear warheads into fuel for nuclear power plants.

Thirty-one countries operate nuclear power plants. Nine nations possess nuclear weapons:

Today, some 26,000 nuclear weapons remain in the arsenals of the nine nuclear powers, with thousands on hair-trigger alert. Although U.S., Russian, and British nuclear arsenals are shrinking in size, those in the four Asian nuclear nations—China, India, Pakistan, and North Korea—are growing, in large part because of tensions among them. This Asian arms race also has possibilities of bringing Japan into the nuclear club.

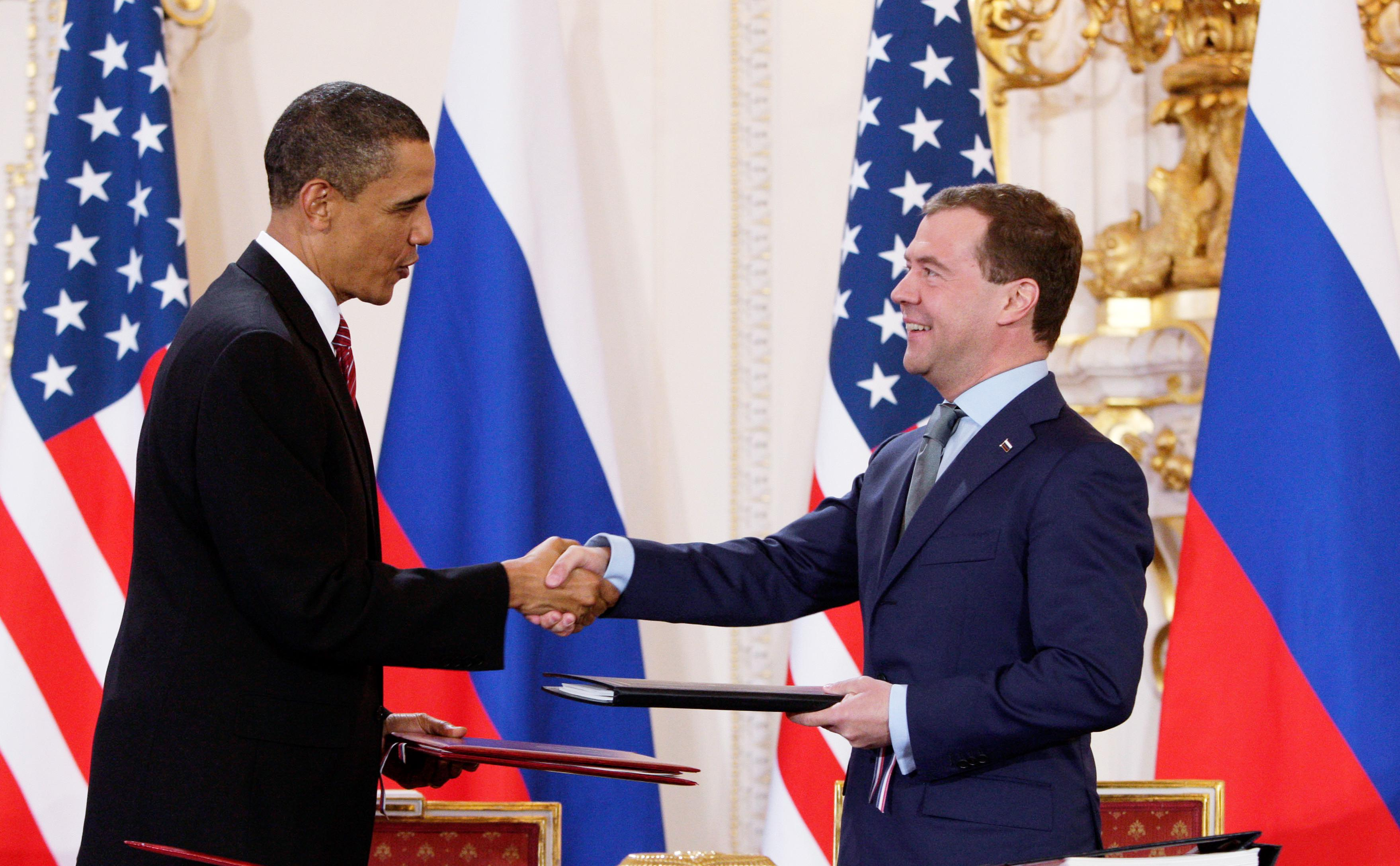
U.S. President Barack Obama with Russian President Dmitry Medvedev after signing the New START treaty in Prague, 2010

During Barack Obama's successful U.S. presidential election campaign, he advocated the abolition of nuclear weapons. Since his election, he has reiterated this goal in several major policy addresses. In 2010, the Obama administration negotiated a new weapons accord with Russia for a reduction of the maximum number of deployed nuclear weapons on each side from 2,200 to between 1,500 and 1,675—a reduction of some 30 per cent. In addition, President Obama has committed $15 billion over the next five years to improving the safety of the nuclear weapons stockpile.

Following the Fukushima Daiichi nuclear disaster, the Italian government put a one-year moratorium on plans to revive nuclear power. On 11–12 June 2011, Italian voters passed a referendum to cancel plans for new reactors. Over 94% of the electorate voted in favor of the construction ban, with 55% of the eligible voters participating, making the vote binding.

German Chancellor Angela Merkel's coalition announced on 30 May 2011, that Germany's 17 nuclear power stations will be shut down by 2022, in a policy reversal following Japan's Fukushima I nuclear accidents and anti-nuclear protests within Germany. Seven of the German power stations were temporarily closed in March and will remain offline and be permanently decommissioned. An eighth was already offline, and will stay so.

As of 2011, countries such as Australia, Austria, Denmark, Greece, Ireland, Italy, Latvia, Liechtenstein, Luxembourg, Malta, Portugal, Israel, Malaysia, New Zealand, and Norway remain opposed to nuclear power. Germany, Switzerland and Belgium are phasing-out nuclear power.

=== Public opinion surveys on nuclear issues ===
Survey respondents in the European Union and US considered investment in nuclear energy to be a higher priority than those in China, though all three favored renewable energy much more strongly than nuclear overall.

In 2005, the International Atomic Energy Agency presented the results of a series of public opinion surveys in the Global Public Opinion on Nuclear Issues report. Majorities of respondents in 14 of the 18 countries surveyed believed that the risk of terrorist acts involving radioactive materials at nuclear facilities is high, because of insufficient protection. While a majority of citizens supported the continued use of existing nuclear power reactors, most did not favor building new nuclear plants, and 25% of respondents felt that all nuclear power plants should be closed down. Stressing the climate change benefits of nuclear energy increases support for expanding the role of nuclear power in the world by 10%; however, there is still a general reluctance to support building more nuclear power plants.

There was little support worldwide for building new nuclear reactors, a 2011 BBC poll indicated. The global research agency GlobeScan, commissioned by BBC News, polled 23,231 people in 23 countries from July to September 2011, several months after the Fukushima nuclear disaster. In countries with existing nuclear programmes, people are significantly more opposed to them than they were in 2005, with only the UK and the US bucking the trend. Most believed that boosting energy efficiency and renewable energy can meet their needs.

The Eurobarometer 2008 poll indicated that 44% supported and 45% opposed nuclear energy in the European Union. The majority (over 62%) also appreciated nuclear power as a means to prevent climate change. Both Eurobarometer and subsequent OECD poll (2010) indicated a "clear correlation between knowledge and support", so respondents who were more aware of the greenhouse gas emissions from energy sector were more likely to support low-emission nuclear power. A 2012 meta-analysis also confirmed positive correlation between support for nuclear power and understanding of nuclear power operations, with a significant effect where people living closer to nuclear power plant showed higher levels of support in general. In the United States, support and opposition to nuclear power plants is split almost equally.

== Criticism ==
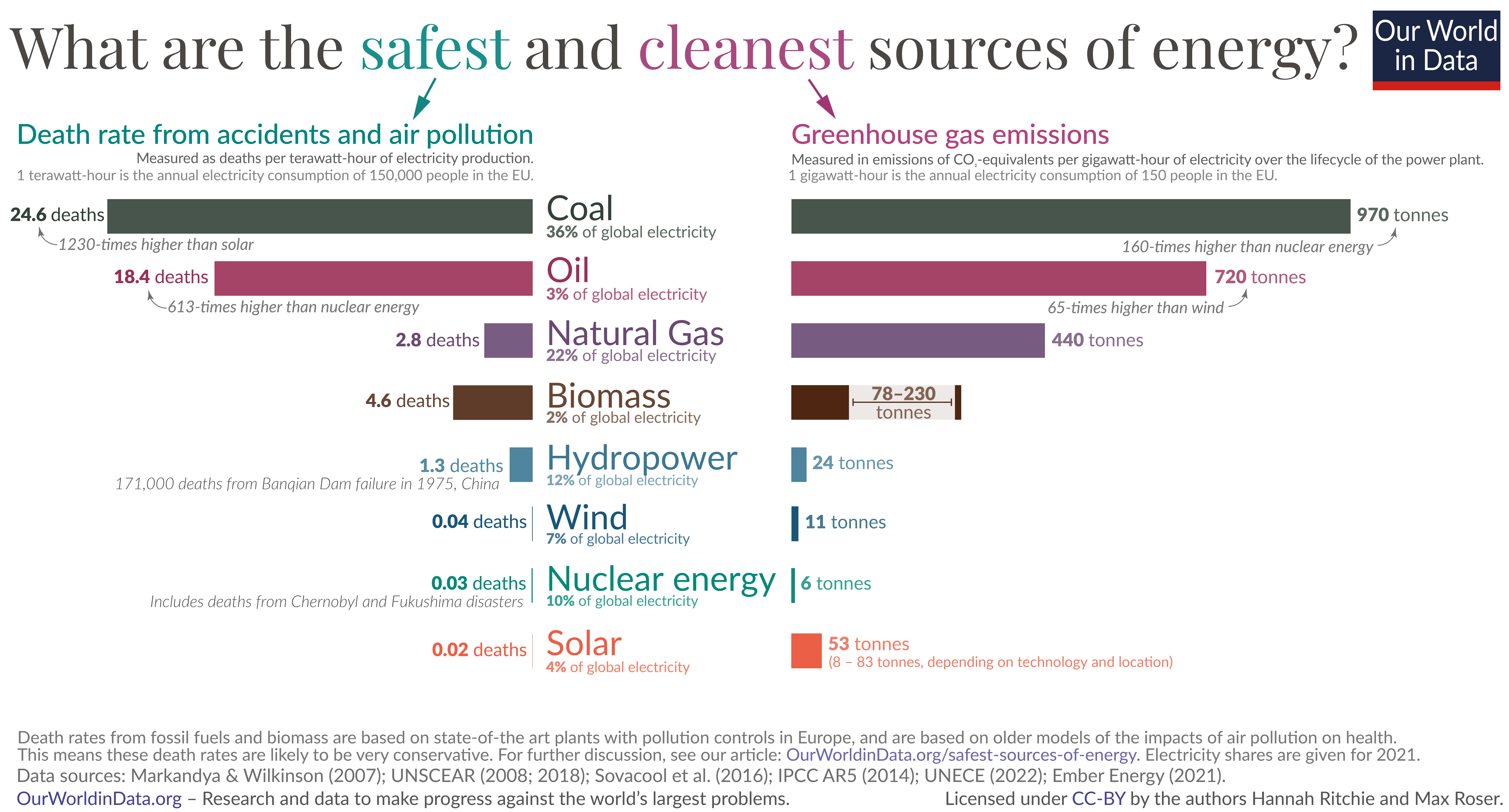
Per unit of energy, nuclear power has low greenhouse gas emissions and has so far been one of the least deadly sources of energy

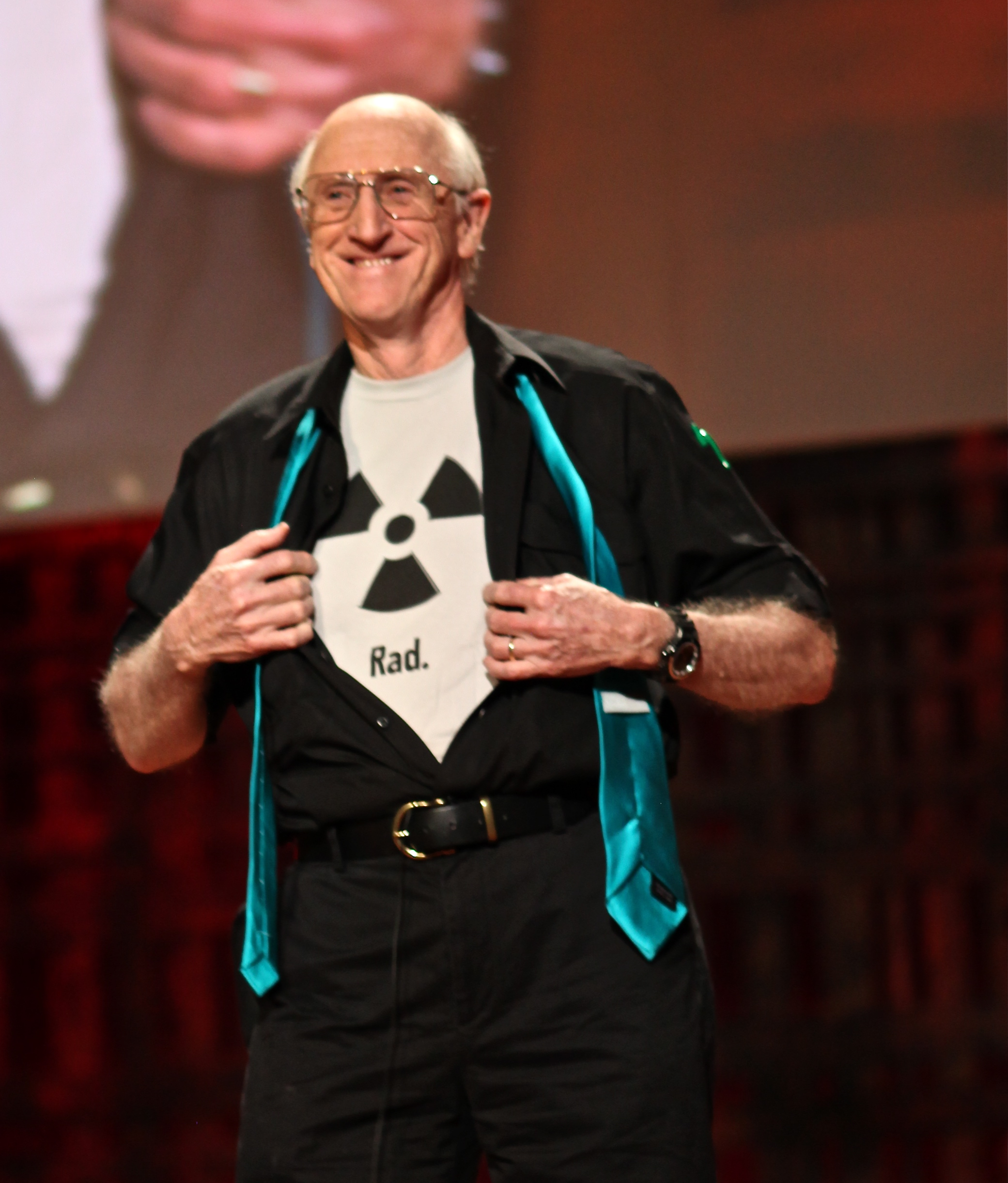
Stewart Brand at a 2010 debate, "Does the world need nuclear energy?"

Attempts to reach political agreement on effective climate change policies continue, and pro-nuclear environmentalists seek to reverse the traditionally anti-nuclear attitudes among environmentalists. Filmmaker Rob Stone's Pandora's Promise (2013) is a good example of this trend.

Some environmentalists criticise the anti-nuclear movement for understating the environmental costs of fossil fuels and non-nuclear alternatives, and overstating the environmental costs of nuclear energy.

Anti-nuclear activists are accused of encouraging radiophobic emotions among the public. In The War Against the Atom (Basic Books, 1982), Samuel MacCracken of Boston University argued that in 1982, 50,000 deaths per year could be attributed directly to non-nuclear power plants, if fuel production and transportation, as well as pollution, were taken into account. He argued that if non-nuclear plants were judged by the same standards as nuclear ones, each US non-nuclear power plant could be held responsible for about 100 deaths per year.

The Nuclear Energy Institute (NEI) is the main lobby group for companies doing nuclear work in the United States, while most countries that employ nuclear energy have a national industry group. The World Nuclear Association is the only global trade body. In seeking to counter the arguments of nuclear opponents, it cites independent studies that quantify the costs and benefits of nuclear energy and compares them with those of alternatives. NEI sponsors studies of its own, but it also references studies performed for the World Health Organization, for the International Energy Agency, and by university researchers.

Critics of the anti-nuclear movement point to independent studies showing that the capital resources required for renewable energy sources are often prohibitively higher than those for nuclear power.

Some people, including former opponents of nuclear energy, criticize the movement, arguing that nuclear power is necessary to reduce carbon dioxide emissions. These individuals include James Lovelock, originator of the Gaia hypothesis, Patrick Moore, an early member of Greenpeace and former director of Greenpeace International, George Monbiot and Stewart Brand, creator of the Whole Earth Catalog. Lovelock goes further to refute claims about the danger of nuclear energy and its waste products. In a January 2008 interview, Moore said that "It wasn't until after I'd left Greenpeace and the climate change issue started coming to the forefront that I started rethinking energy policy in general and realised that I had been incorrect in my analysis of nuclear as being some kind of evil plot." Stewart Brand has apologized for his past anti-nuclear stance in the 2010 book Whole Earth Discipline, saying that "Greens caused gigatons of carbon dioxide to enter the atmosphere from the coal and gas burning that went ahead instead of nuclear".

Some anti-nuclear organisations have acknowledged that their positions are subject to review.

In April 2007, Dan Becker, Director of Global Warming for the Sierra Club, declared, "Switching from dirty coal plants to dangerous nuclear power is like giving up smoking cigarettes and taking up crack." James Lovelock criticizes holders of such a view: "Opposition to nuclear energy is based on irrational fear fed by Hollywood-style fiction, the Green lobbies and the media." ". . . I am a Green and I entreat my friends in the movement to drop their wrongheaded objection to nuclear energy."

George Monbiot, an English writer known for his environmental and political activism, once expressed deep antipathy to the nuclear industry. He finally rejected his later neutral position regarding nuclear power in March 2011. Monbiot now advocates its use, having been convinced of its relative safety by what he considers the limited effects of the 2011 Japan tsunami on nuclear reactors in the region. Subsequently, he has harshly condemned the anti-nuclear movement, writing that it "has misled the world about the impacts of radiation on human health ... made [claims] ungrounded in science, unsupportable when challenged and wildly wrong." He singled out Helen Caldicott for, he wrote, making unsourced and inaccurate claims, dismissing contrary evidence as part of a cover-up, and overstating the death toll from the Chernobyl disaster by a factor of more than 140.

== See also ==
- The Bomb
- Doomsday Clock
- Environmental movement
- John Gofman
- Green politics
- International Day against Nuclear Tests
- List of Chernobyl-related articles
- List of nuclear whistleblowers
- List of peace activists
- List of states with nuclear weapons
- Lists of nuclear disasters and radioactive incidents
- Mainau Declaration
- Mayors for Peace
- Gregory Minor
- Nuclear-Free Future Award
- Nuclear-free zone
- Nuclear organizations (Wikipedia category)
- Nuclear power phase-out
- Nuclear safety and security
- Nuclear weapons convention
- Nuclear weapons in popular culture
- Otto Hahn Peace Medal
- Pandora's Promise
- Plowshares movement
- The Ribbon International
- Uranium
- Vulnerability of nuclear plants to attack
- World Association of Nuclear Operators
- Hiroshima rages, Nagasaki prays

== Bibliography ==
- Brown, Jerry and Rinaldo Brutoco (1997). Profiles in Power: The Anti-nuclear Movement and the Dawn of the Solar Age, Twayne Publishers.
- Byrne, John and Steven M. Hoffman (1996). Governing the Atom: The Politics of Risk, Transaction Publishers.
- Clarfield, Gerald H. and William M. Wiecek (1984). Nuclear America: Military and Civilian Nuclear Power in the United States 1940–1980, Harper & Row.
- Cooke, Stephanie (2009). In Mortal Hands: A Cautionary History of the Nuclear Age, Black Inc.
- Cragin, Susan (2007). Nuclear Nebraska: The Remarkable Story of the Little County That Couldn't Be Bought, AMACOM.
- Dickerson, Carrie B. and Patricia Lemon (1995). Black Fox: Aunt Carrie's War Against the Black Fox Nuclear Power Plant, Council Oak Publishing Company, ISBN 1-57178-009-2
- Diesendorf, Mark (2009). Climate Action: A Campaign Manual for Greenhouse Solutions, University of New South Wales Press.
- Diesendorf, Mark (2007). Greenhouse Solutions with Sustainable Energy, University of New South Wales Press.
- Elliott, David (2007). Nuclear or Not? Does Nuclear Power Have a Place in a Sustainable Energy Future?, Palgrave.
- Falk, Jim (1982). Global Fission: The Battle Over Nuclear Power, Oxford University Press.
- Fradkin, Philip L. (2004). Fallout: An American Nuclear Tragedy, University of Arizona Press.
- Freeman, Stephanie L. (2023) Dreams for a Decade: International Nuclear Abolitionism and the End of the Cold War (University of Pennsylvania Press, 2023). ISBN 978-1-5128-2422-3
- Giugni, Marco (2004). Social Protest and Policy Change: Ecology, Antinuclear, and Peace Movements in Comparative Perspective, Rowman and Littlefield.
- Lovins, Amory B. (1977). Soft Energy Paths: Towards a Durable Peace, Friends of the Earth International, ISBN 0-06-090653-7
- Lovins, Amory B. and John H. Price (1975). Non-Nuclear Futures: The Case for an Ethical Energy Strategy, Ballinger Publishing Company, 1975, ISBN 0-88410-602-0
- Lowe, Ian (2007). Reaction Time: Climate Change and the Nuclear Option, Quarterly Essay.
- McCafferty, David P. (1991). The Politics of Nuclear Power: A History of the Shoreham Power Plant, Kluwer.
- McKay, George (2019) '"They've got a bomb": sounding anti-nuclearism in the anarcho-punk movement in Britain, 1978–84.' Archived 2 July 2022 at the Wayback Machine Rock Music Studies 6(2): 1–20.
- McKay, George (2021) 'Rethinking the cultural politics of punk: anti-nuclear and anti-war (post-)punk popular music in 1980s Britain.' Archived 6 October 2021 at the Wayback Machine In George McKay and Gina Arnold, eds. The Oxford Handbook of Punk Rock. New York: Oxford University Press.
- Natti, Susanna and Bonnie Acker (1979). No Nukes: Everyone's Guide to Nuclear Power, South End Press.
- Newtan, Samuel Upton (2007). Nuclear War 1 and Other Major Nuclear Disasters of the 20th Century, AuthorHouse.
- Ondaatje, Elizabeth H. (c1988). Trends in Antinuclear Protests in the United States, 1984–1987, Rand Corporation.
- Parkinson, Alan (2007). Maralinga: Australia's Nuclear Waste Cover-up, ABC Books.
- Pernick, Ron and Clint Wilder (2012). Clean Tech Nation: How the U.S. Can Lead in the New Global Economy.
- Peterson, Christian (2003). Ronald Reagan and Antinuclear Movements in the United States and Western Europe, 1981–1987, Edwin Mellen Press.
- Price, Jerome (1982). The Antinuclear Movement, Twayne Publishers.
- Rudig, Wolfgang (1990). Anti-nuclear Movements: A World Survey of Opposition to Nuclear Energy, Longman.
- Schneider, Mycle, Steve Thomas, Antony Froggatt, Doug Koplow (August 2009). The World Nuclear Industry Status Report, German Federal Ministry of Environment, Nature Conservation and Reactor Safety.
- Smith, Jennifer (Editor), (2002). The Antinuclear Movement, Cengage Gale.
- Sovacool, Benjamin K. (2011). Contesting the Future of Nuclear Power: A Critical Global Assessment of Atomic Energy, World Scientific.
- Surbrug, Robert (2009). Beyond Vietnam: The Politics of Protest in Massachusetts, 1974–1990, University of Massachusetts Press.
- Walker, J. Samuel (2004). Three Mile Island: A Nuclear Crisis in Historical Perspective, University of California Press.
- Wellock, Thomas R. (1998). Critical Masses: Opposition to Nuclear Power in California, 1958–1978, The University of Wisconsin Press, ISBN 0-299-15850-0
- Wills, John (2006). Conservation Fallout: Nuclear Protest at Diablo Canyon, University of Nevada Press.
- Wittner, Lawrence S. (2009). Confronting the Bomb: A Short History of the World Nuclear Disarmament Movement, Stanford University Press.
