= Nuclear energy policy by country =

National nuclear energy policy is a national policy concerning some or all aspects of nuclear energy, such as mining for nuclear fuel, extraction and processing of nuclear fuel from the ore, generating electricity by nuclear power, enriching and storing spent nuclear fuel and nuclear fuel reprocessing. Nuclear energy policies often include the regulation of energy use and standards relating to the nuclear fuel cycle.

Nuclear power stations operate in 31 countries. China has 32 new reactors under construction, and there are also a considerable number of new reactors being built in South Korea, India, and Russia. At the same time, at least 100 older and smaller reactors will "most probably be closed over the next 10-15 years". So the expanding nuclear programs in Asia are balanced by retirements of aging plants and nuclear reactor phase-outs. Global nuclear electricity generation in 2012 was at its lowest level since 1999.

Following the March 2011 Fukushima nuclear disaster in Japan, Germany has permanently shut down eight of its reactors and pledged to close the rest by 2022. Italy voted to keep their country non-nuclear. Switzerland and Spain have banned the construction of new reactors. Japan's prime minister has called for a dramatic reduction in Japan's reliance on nuclear power. Taiwan's president did the same. Mexico has sidelined construction of 10 reactors in favor of developing natural-gas-fired plants. Belgium planned to phase out its nuclear plants by 2025, later postponed by 10 years to 2035.

== List ==
Country	Operating Reactors	Constructing Reactors	Debates to Construct Reactors	Planning to Phase Out Existing Reactors	Nuclear Restriction Policy
Albania	No	No	No	—N/a	
Algeria	Research	No	No		
Argentina	Yes	Yes	Yes		
Armenia	Yes	No	Yes		
Australia	Research	No	Yes	—N/a	Nuclear power is illegal (see also nuclear energy in Australia)
Austria	No	No	No	—N/a	Nuclear reactions are forbidden by law since 1978, prolonged in 1997
Bangladesh	No	Yes	Yes		
Belarus	Yes	No	Yes	—N/a	
Belgium	Yes	No	No	Yes (2035)	Phase-out by 2035
Brazil	Yes	Yes	No		
Bulgaria	Yes	No	Yes	No	
Burma	No	No		—N/a	
Canada	Yes	No	Yes	No	
Chile	No	No	No	—N/a	
China	Yes	Yes	Yes	No	
Croatia	No (shared plant in Slovenia)	No	No		
Czech Republic	Yes	Planning	Yes	No	
Denmark	No	No	No	—N/a	1985 law prohibits production
Egypt	Research	Yes	Yes		
Finland	Yes	Yes	Yes	No	
France	Yes	Yes	Yes	No	Share of 50% nuclear in power sector by 2035 (Loi énergie-climat, 2019 - pushed back from 2025 in Energy Transition for Green Growth Act (LTECV) from 2015)
Ghana	Research	No	No	—N/a	
Germany	Research	No	No	Yes (phase out completed)	Original phase-out planned for 2022, but delayed to 15 April 2023
Greece	No	No	No	—N/a	Research reactor GRR-1 in extended shutdown
Hong Kong	No (shared plant in China)	No	No	—N/a	
Hungary	Yes	Yes	No	No	
India	Yes	Yes	Yes	No	
Ireland	No	No	No	—N/a	1999 law prohibits production
Israel	Research	No	No	—N/a	
Iran	Yes	Yes	Yes	No	
Italy	Research	No	Yes	—N/a	Phase out in late 1980s, a first attempt to restore nuclear power was rejected in 2011. In 2026 the Parliament approved a law allowing the building of new power plants (see also nuclear power in Italy, 1987 Italian referendums and 2011 Italian referendums).
Japan	Yes	No	Yes	No	
Jordan	No	Research	Yes	—N/a	
Kazakhstan	No	No	Yes		
Kenya	No	Research	No	No	
Libya	No	No			
Lithuania	No	No	Yes	—N/a	
Luxembourg	No	No	No	—N/a	
Malta	No	No	No	—N/a	
Mexico	Yes	No	No	No	
Morocco	No	Research	Yes	No	
Netherlands	Yes	No	Yes	No	
Nigeria	Research	No	No	No	
New Zealand	No	No	No	—N/a	
North Korea	No	No	No	—N/a	
Norway	No	No	No	—N/a	
Pakistan	Yes	Yes	No	No	
Philippines	No	No	Yes		
Portugal	No	No	No	No	Research reactor decommissioned in 2019
Poland	Research	Planning	Yes	No	
Romania	Yes	No	Yes		
Russia	Yes	Yes	Yes	No	
Serbia	Yes	Yes	Yes	—N/a	Construction of nuclear power plants was banned in 1989. The Law was repealed in November 2024. As of January 2025 Serbia is in talks with French government to build a nuclear power plant.
Slovakia	Yes	Yes	No	No	
Slovenia	Yes	No			
South Africa	Yes	No	Yes		
South Korea	Yes	Yes	Yes	No	
Spain	Yes	No	No	Yes	
Sri Lanka	No	No	Yes		
Sweden	Yes	No	Yes	No	Former phase-out plans scrapped. Limit of 10 total reactors also scrapped.
Switzerland	Yes	No	No	Yes	Yes
Syria	No	No		—N/a	
Taiwan	Research	No	No	Yes (phase out completed)	Last commercial nuclear power plant was shut down at the end of its 40 year operational licence on 17 May 2025. A referendum to restart the last plant was unsuccessful.
Thailand	No	No	Yes	—N/a	
Tunisia	No	No	No	—N/a	
Turkey	No	Yes	No	No	
Ukraine	Yes	Yes	Yes	No	
United Arab Emirates	Yes	Yes	Yes	No	
United Kingdom	Yes	Yes	Yes	No	
United States	Yes	Yes	Yes	No	Yes, in California, Connecticut, Hawaii, Illinois, Maine, Massachusetts, Minnesota, New Jersey, New York, Oregon, Rhode Island and Vermont.
Uruguay	No	No		—N/a	Yes
Uzbekistan	No	Yes	No	—N/a	
Venezuela	No	No	No	—N/a	—N/a
Vietnam	No	No	Yes		

== Africa ==
=== Egypt ===
In November 2015 and March 2017 Egypt signed preliminary agreements with Russian nuclear company Rosatom for a first VVER-1200 unit at El Dabaa to start in 2024. Discussions continue for final approval.

=== Ghana ===
Ghana has research reactors, but no power plants.

=== Kenya ===
Kenya aims to build a 1,000 MWe nuclear power plant by 2030.

=== South Africa ===
South Africa is the only country in Africa with a commercial nuclear power plant and it currently has an expansion policy.

=== Tunisia ===
Tunisia has no operating power plants and has historically focused its nuclear program on the peaceful applications of nuclear technology. The country has nevertheless considered nuclear power as a possible component of its future energy mix, including the use of small modular reactors (SMRs) and nuclear energy for seawater desalination. In September 2025, Tunisia adopted a framework program for 2025-2029 to guide the safe and responsible use of nuclear technologies, while also working to establish a legal framework for their peaceful use.

== Asia ==
=== Bangladesh ===
Bangladesh considered building a nuclear power plant for the first time in 1961. Since then, several feasibility studies have been carried out, affirming the feasibility of the project. In 1963 the Rooppur site was selected. More recently, in 2001 Bangladesh adopted a national Nuclear Power Action Plan. On 24 June 2007, Bangladesh's government announced it will build a nuclear power plant to meet electricity shortages. The first nuclear power plant with a generation capacity between 700 and 1,000 MW will be installed by 2015 at Rooppur in Pabna district.

=== China ===
As of March 2014, China has 20 operating reactors, and 28 reactors under construction. Additional reactors are planned, providing 58 GWe of capacity by 2020.

=== Gulf states ===
Six member states of the Gulf Cooperation Council (Kuwait, Saudi Arabia, Bahrain, the United Arab Emirates, Qatar and Oman) have announced that the Council is commissioning a study on the peaceful use of nuclear energy. In February 2007 they agreed with the IAEA to cooperate on a feasibility study for a regional nuclear power and desalination program.

The United Arab Emirates adopted a national policy on nuclear energy in July 2008 and a national nuclear energy law on 4 October 2009. According to the law and the policy document, the Emirates Nuclear Energy Corporation was established. Memorandums of understanding on cooperation in peaceful uses of nuclear energy are signed with France, the United States and the United Kingdom. In December 2009, the UAE decided to build a nuclear power plant with four APR1400 reactors. The first reactor to be developed by the Korea Electric Power came online in 2017. The plant is located at Barakah, 53 kilometres (33 mi) from Ruwais.

On 29 March 2008, Bahrain signed a memorandum of understanding on nuclear energy with the United States.

In 2010 the Kuwait National Nuclear Energy Committee and the Russian company Rosatom signed a memorandum of understanding on the use of nuclear energy.

=== India ===
India has 20 reactors operating and 6 reactors under construction.

India has encountered effective local anti-nuclear opposition, growing national wariness about foreign nuclear reactors, and a nuclear liability controversy that threatens to prevent new reactor imports. There have been mass protests against the French-backed 9900 MW Jaitapur Nuclear Power Project in Maharashtra and the 2000 MW Koodankulam Nuclear Power Plant in Tamil Nadu. The state government of West Bengal state has also refused permission to a proposed 6000 MW facility near the town of Haripur that intended to host six Russian reactors.

=== Indonesia ===
In the mid-1990s, Indonesia conducted a feasibility study into constructing 12 nuclear power plants. The plan was postponed due to criticism from environmentalists and the Asian regional economic crisis in 1997. In 2006, Indonesian Government announced a plan to build its first major nuclear power plant on Muria peninsula, Jepara district, Central Java by 2015. However, this decision is not final yet. This plan is heavily criticized by environmental organisations.

In June 2007 was announced that in Gorontalo will be set up 70 MW floating nuclear power plant of Russian origin.

=== Iran ===
In the mid-1970s, Iran started construction of two PWR units at [Bushehr], but the project was suspended in 1979. In 1994, Russia agreed to complete unit 1 of Bushehr nuclear power plant and it was expected to be completed late in 2007. Also second reactor is planned at Bushehr. It also announced that a new nuclear power plant is to be built at Darkhovin in Khūzestān Province, where two plants were about to be constructed in the 1970s. Currently, Iran has reported that a power plant at Bushehr is operational.

Iran plans to build at least 19 more reactors with cumulative capacity of 20,000 MW by 2025 out of which at least six reactors are expected to be operational by 2020

=== Israel ===
Israel has no nuclear power plants. However, in January 2007, Israeli Infrastructure Minister Binyamin Ben-Eliezer said his country should consider producing nuclear power for civilian purposes. As a result of the nuclear emergencies at Japan's Fukushima I Nuclear Power Plant, on 17 March 2011, Prime Minister Benjamin Netanyahu indicated that Israel would not develop nuclear power.

=== Japan ===
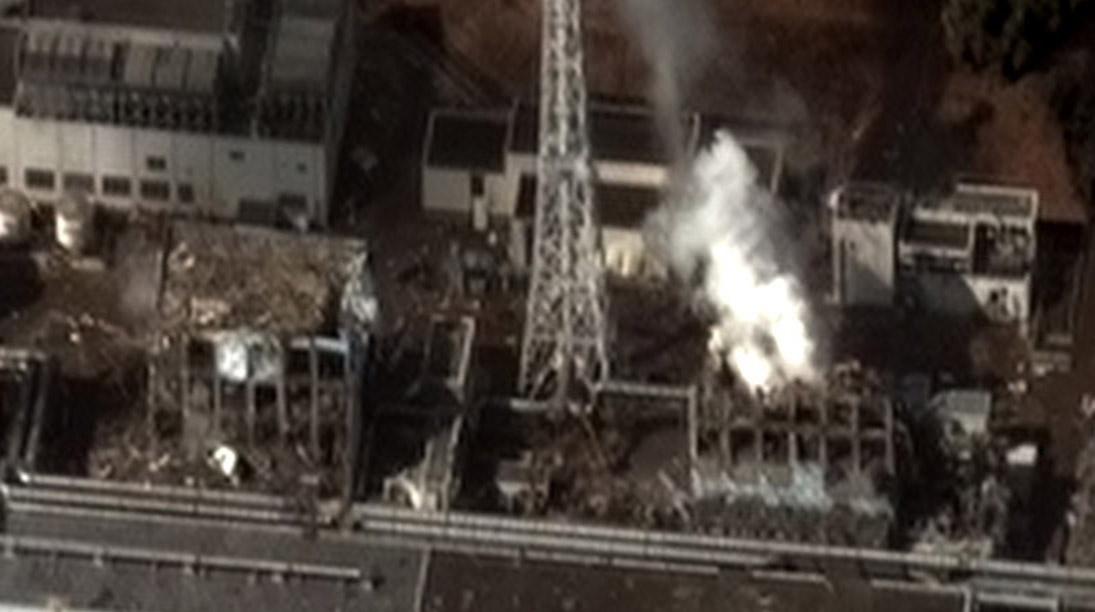
The 2011 Fukushima Daiichi nuclear disaster, the worst nuclear accident in 25 years, displaced 50,000 households after radiation leaked into the air, soil and sea. Radiation checks led to bans of some shipments of vegetables and fish.

Nuclear energy was a national strategic priority in Japan, but there has been concern about the ability of Japan's nuclear plants to withstand seismic activity. The Kashiwazaki-Kariwa Nuclear Power Plant was completely shut down for 21 months following an earthquake in 2007.

Following an earthquake triggered tsunami, and the failure of cooling systems at the Fukushima I Nuclear Power Plant on 11 March 2011, a nuclear emergency was declared. This was the first time a nuclear emergency had been declared in Japan, and 140,000 residents within 20 km of the plant were evacuated. The total amount of radioactive material released is unclear, as the crisis is ongoing.

On 6 May 2011, Prime Minister Naoto Kan ordered the Hamaoka Nuclear Power Plant be shut down as an earthquake of magnitude 8.0 or higher is likely to hit the area within the next 30 years. Kan wanted to avoid a possible repeat of the Fukushima disaster. On 9 May 2011, Chubu Electric decided to comply with the government request. Kan later called for a new energy policy with less reliance on nuclear power.

Problems in stabilizing the Fukushima I nuclear plant have hardened attitudes to nuclear power. As of June 2011, "more than 80 percent of Japanese now say they are anti-nuclear and distrust government information on radiation". Post-Fukushima polls suggest that somewhere "between 41 and 54 percent of Japanese support scrapping, or reducing the numbers of, nuclear power plants". Tens of thousands of people marched in central Tokyo in September 2011, chanting "Sayonara nuclear power" and waving banners, to call on Japan's government to abandon atomic energy. As of October 2011, only 11 nuclear power plants are operating. There have been electricity shortages, but Japan survived the summer without the extensive blackouts that had been predicted. An energy white paper, approved by the Japanese Cabinet in October 2011, says "public confidence in safety of nuclear power was greatly damaged" by the Fukushima disaster, and calls for a reduction in the nation's reliance on nuclear power.

=== Jordan ===
Jordan has signed memorandums of understanding with the United States, United Kingdom, Canada, France, Japan, China, and South Korea. In December 2009, Jordan Atomic Energy Commission (JAEC) in cooperation with a consortium headed by the Korean Atomic Energy Research Institute signed an agreement with Daewoo Heavy Industries to build a its first 5 MW research reactor by 2014 at the Jordan University of Science and Technology. The research reactor will become a focal point for a Nuclear Technology Centre, which will train upcoming generations of nuclear engineers and scientists in the Kingdom in addition to provide irradiation services for the industrial, agricultural and medical sectors.

Jordan plans to start building its first nuclear power plant by 2013 at the site about 20 kilometres (12 mi) from Aqaba. It will be used for electricity generation and desalination. The studies are carried out by Tractebel Engineering.

Jordan has also granted Areva exclusive mining rights for uranium in central Jordan.

=== Kazakhstan ===
Kazakhstan shut down its only NPP in 1999. In 2003, the Minister of Energy and Mines announced plans for the construction of a new NPP within the next 15 years. The two–three unit NPP is to be established on the shores of Lake Balkhash in the Karaganda region of central Kazakhstan.

=== North Korea ===
North Korea has no nuclear power program currently. Earlier the building of nuclear plant near Sinpo was started by USSR but construction was cancelled due to lack of funding. Under the Agreed Framework, North Korea agreed to end its graphite-moderated nuclear reactor program in exchange for construction of two PWRs at Kumho, but construction was suspended in November 2003. Under the Six-Party Talks, 19 September 2005 North Korea pledged to end all its nuclear programs and return to the Nuclear Non-Proliferation Treaty, in exchange for international inspections in return for benefits including energy aid and normalization of relations with Japan and the United States.

=== South Korea ===
South Korea has 24 operational nuclear power reactors, with four more under construction.

=== Malaysia ===
Although Malaysia has established Nuclear Agency and been actively involved in the periodic review of the nuclear option, currently there is no nuclear power generation plant, and plans for a future nuclear plant are exploring the feasibility of such a plant.

=== Myanmar ===
On 15 May 2007, Myanmar and Russia signed an agreement to construct a nuclear research center in Myanmar. The center will comprise a 10 MWt light water reactor working on 20%-enriched U-235, an activation analysis laboratory, a medical isotope production laboratory, silicon doping system, nuclear waste treatment and burial facilities. Groups such as Greenpeace are concerned that such technology may pose possible security threats.

=== Pakistan ===
Pakistan operates five reactors generating 1430 MW, is building three new (3x1150). The current total nuclear generating capacity is 1430 MWe. Pakistan plans on constructing 32 reactors by 2050.

=== Saudi Arabia ===
Saudi Arabia hopes to build 16 reactors but has none. Saudi Arabia has commissioned Westinghouse Electric Company to build the AP1000 reactors.

=== Syria ===
Syria abandoned its plans to build a VVER-440 reactor after the Chernobyl accident. The plans of nuclear program were revived at the beginning of the 2000s when Syria negotiated with Russia to build a nuclear facility that would include a nuclear power plant and a seawater atomic desalination plant.

=== Taiwan ===
In Taiwan nuclear energy policy is a contentious issue. On World Environment Day in June 2011, environmental groups protested against the nation's three operating nuclear power plants and the construction of a fourth plant.

The government elected in 2016 has policies that include a move toward a nuclear-free society, and is considering legislating to phase out nuclear power generation within nine years.

=== Thailand ===
According to the energy minister of Thailand, the state owned Electricity Generating Authority of Thailand will build its first two nuclear power plants by 2021. This decision was criticized by Greenpeace, which suggested to focus on alternative power supplies from hydropower and smaller biofuel plants before risking nuclear.

=== Turkey ===
Turkey is developing nuclear power as part of its long-term energy policy. The first nuclear power plant, Akkuyu in Mersin Province, consists of four Russian-designed VVER-1200 reactors with a combined capacity of 4.8 GW; the first unit is expected to begin generating electricity in 2026. Turkey is also planning additional nuclear plants in Sinop and the Thrace region and is considering small modular reactors. The government has stated a target of approximately 20 GW of installed nuclear capacity by the 2050s.

=== Uzbekistan ===
On May 27, 2024, Uzbeki President Shavkat Mirziyoyev announced the construction of a 330 megawatt capacity powerplant by Russian state-owned energy company, Rosatom following high level discussions.

=== Vietnam ===
In the 1980s Vietnam undertook two preliminary nuclear power studies, which concluded that there was a need to introduce nuclear energy in order to meet the expected growth in electricity demand. A national energy plan stated that the nuclear power program was to be commenced by 2010. In February 2006, the government announced the first nuclear power plant would be commissioned by 2017. In June 2010, Vietnam announced that it plans to build fourteen reactors at eight locations by 2030, providing 10% of the nation's electricity. In October 2010, it signed an agreement with Russia for the construction of the country's first nuclear power plant, Ninh Thuan 1, due to begin in 2014.

However, in November 2016 Vietnam decided to abandon nuclear power plans as they were "not economically viable because of other cheaper sources of power".

Vietnam has since reversed this decision. In November 2024, the government approved the revival of the Ninh Thuan nuclear power program, and in 2025 nuclear power was formally reintroduced into the national power development plan. The first nuclear plants are expected to become operational between 2030 and 2035, with a combined capacity of up to 6.4 GW, while a further 8 GW is planned by mid-century. The renewed program forms part of Vietnam’s efforts to expand electricity supply and reduce reliance on fossil fuels, while supporting its target of achieving net-zero emissions by 2050.

=== Yemen ===
Yemen has called for establishing The Arab Atomic Energy Agency for nuclear researches and using them for peaceful means, especially generating electricity.

== Europe ==
=== Albania ===
Albania presently has no nuclear power plants, but in 2007 the government discussed constructing a nuclear power plant at Durrës. In addition to meeting the domestic energy demands, the plan foresaw electricity export to neighboring Balkan countries and Italy via an underwater cable, which would link the Italian and Albanian electricity networks. In April 2009, Albania and Croatia announced a plan to jointly construct a 1,500 MWe nuclear power plant on the shores of Lake Scutari (Lake Shkodër), near Albania's border with Montenegro.

=== Armenia ===
The Armenian Nuclear Power Plant is the only nuclear power plant in the South Caucasus region. It is located 36 kilometers west of Armenia's capital, Yerevan. The plant was activated on 22 December 1976.

=== Belgium ===
The Belgian government in 2003 passed legislation banning the construction of new reactors for power generation. The existing ones were to be phased out after a 40-year lifespan. This implies that by 2025 all seven operating reactors would be shut down. The first three reactors were originally to be closed by 2015, however the lifespan of the Tihange-1 reactor was expanded through to 2025. The phase-out was confirmed in 2018.

=== Bulgaria ===
The Bulgarian government has favored nuclear energy to generate electricity since 1956 and its first commercial nuclear reactor began to operate in 1974. Currently, two reactors are operational providing approximately 35% of the country's electricity. The government had plans to build two new units at the Belene Nuclear Power Plant. A contract with Russian Atomstroyexport has been signed for two AES-92 VVER-1000 reactors. It is expected this plant will not be built, the necessary investment is not there.

=== Czech Republic ===
The Czechoslovak government completed its first nuclear power plant – a gas-cooled heavy water reactor – in 1972 in Bohunice. The country's first commercial nuclear power plant began operating in 1985, and the government is still committed to nuclear energy today. The Czech Republic currently has six nuclear reactors with a net MWe of 3,472 and plans to build two more 1,500 MWe reactors by 2020. According to data from 1990 to 2005, the Czech Republic posted the largest increase in nuclear energy capacity (114%) and energy production (96%) of any EU country. Furthermore, the Czech Republic exported 24,985 GWh in 2005.

=== Denmark ===
Denmark currently has no nuclear power generation, following a 1985 decision to exclude nuclear energy from national energy planning. However, the government is now reassessing the policy, including the potential role of small modular reactors (SMRs). A 2026 Danish Energy Agency study found that SMRs could realistically be deployed from the 2040s, although costs and regulatory uncertainties remain significant. This debate comes as renewables already accounted for 79.7% of Danish electricity consumption in 2024, with wind providing a major share.

=== Finland ===
Finland has four commercial reactors, which provide 27% of the country's electricity. Two VVER-440 pressurized water reactors built by Atomenergoeksport and commissioned in 1977 and 1980, are located in Loviisa Nuclear Power Plant. They are operated by Fortum. Two boiling water reactors built by Asea-Atom (now Westinghouse Electric Company) and commissioned in 1978 and 1980, are located at the Olkiluoto plant in Eurajoki, near Rauma. They are owned and operated by Teollisuuden Voima, a subsidiary of Pohjolan Voima. In 2002, the cabinet's decision to allow the construction of fifth reactor (the third at Olkiluoto) was accepted in the parliament. The reactor under construction is the European Pressurized Reactor, built by French company Areva. It is scheduled to start electricity production no earlier than 2015, a schedule slippage of at least six years.

On 21 April 2010, the cabinet decided to grant permits for construction of the sixth and seventh commercial reactors to Teollisuuden Voima and Fennovoima, a subsidiary of E.ON. The former will build the reactor at the Olkiluoto plant, and the latter at a new site in Pyhäjoki. The cabinet rejected the third application, by Fortum, to build a new reactor at Loviisa.

The nuclear power companies are responsible for storage and disposal of nuclear waste. Prior to 1994, Finnish companies exported their nuclear waste to the Soviet Union. However, a Finnish law passed in 1994 prohibited the transport of nuclear waste abroad. With this law, Finland became the first country that decided to encapsulate spent nuclear fuel into deep geological repositories. The construction of the first such repository, Onkalo, is set to begin in 2012, with an estimated completion date of 2020. Once in operation, the disposal process will involve putting twelve fuel assemblies into a boron steel canister and enclosing it into a copper capsule. Each capsule will then be placed in its own hole in the repository and packed with bentonite clay. The estimated cost of this project is about €818 million, which includes construction, encapsulation, and operating costs. The State Nuclear Waste Management Fund has saved approximately €1.4 billion from charges for generated electricity.

According to a TNS Gallup survey conducted in January 2010, 48% of Finns had a positive view of nuclear power, and 17% were negative.

=== France ===
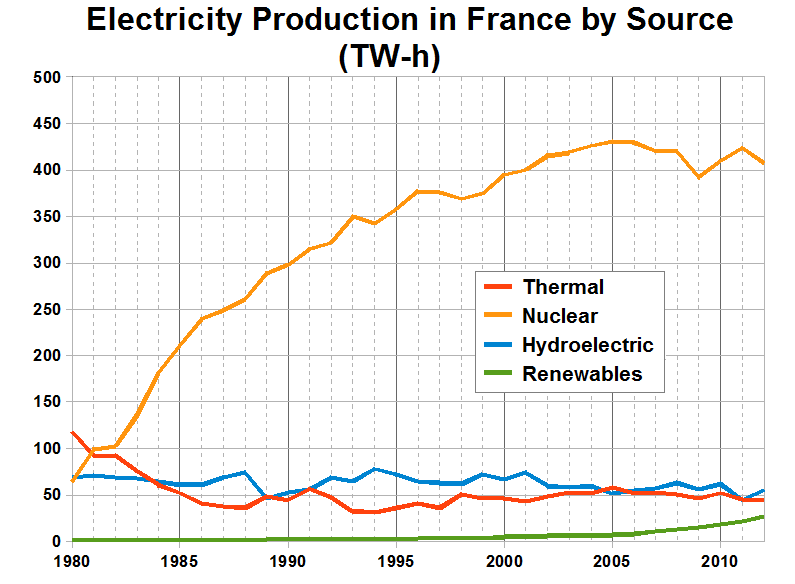
Graph shows the increase in electricity production from nuclear power in France

After the oil crisis of the early 1970s, the French government decided in 1974 to move towards self-sufficiency in electricity production, primarily through the construction of nuclear power stations. France today produces around 78.1% of its electricity through nuclear power. Because France produces an overall electricity surplus, it exports nuclear-produced energy. The Board of Electricité de France (EDF) has approved construction of a 1630 MWe European Pressurized Reactor at Flamanville, Normandy. Construction is expected to begin in late 2007, with completion in 2012.

France established a law in 2005 requiring that nuclear power be central to energy policy and security. Under this law, France would build a third-generation nuclear reactors, by 2015, of which it may decide to build forty more. Each EPR reactor would produce 1,600 MW of electricity versus the 900 MW that current reactors produce. The EPR reactor was also recognized as safer and more efficient. In August 2005, EDF announced that it wanted to replace all of its reactors with EPR reactors.

EDF reprocesses approximately 850 of the 1,200 tons of used fuel each year. The reprocessed spent fuel is made into plutonium. The plutonium is then converted into fresh mixed oxide (MOX) fuel, which is used in over 35 reactors across Europe. These reactors can load approximately 20-50% of their cores with the MOX fuel.

Following the 2011 Fukushima I nuclear accidents, the head of France's nuclear safety agency has said that France needs to upgrade the protection of vital functions in all its nuclear reactors to avoid a disaster in the event of a natural calamity, adding there was no need to close any plants.

Many problems brought Fukushima I nuclear accidents to the nuclear power in France however. The initial budget for building Flamanville-3 of €3.3 billions jumped to €8.5 billions at the moment and the power price might reach 100EUR/MWh. EDF could not go below a price of 100GBP/MWh for a 30-year contract when they had to make an offer to UK for replacement of some old nuclear reactors. That is around 115EUR/MWh, when an average price of only 60EUR/MWh for producing power from any source could be considered profitable in Western Europe. Francois Hollande sticks to his campaign pledge to reduce the share of nuclear energy in the power supply in France to 50% from 75% by 2025. Areva, which was the symbol of the nuclear power in Europe for long time, lost over 80% of its shares and had to start investing in wind power. According to a poll conducted by BBC, the opposition to building new reactors in pro-nuclear France has risen from 66% in 2005 to 83% in 2011

=== Germany ===
Nuclear power in Germany accounted for 23% of national electricity consumption, before the permanent shutdown of 8 plants in March 2011. German nuclear power began with research reactors in the 1950s and 1960s with the first commercial plant coming online in 1969. It has been high on the political agenda in recent decades, with continuing debates about when the technology should be phased out. The topic received renewed attention at the start of 2007 due to the political impact of the Russia-Belarus energy dispute and in 2011 after the Fukushima I nuclear accidents.

On 30 May 2011, Germany formally announced plans to abandon nuclear energy completely within 11 years. The plan includes the immediate permanent closure of six nuclear power plants that had been temporarily shut down for testing in March 2011, and two more that have been offline a few years with technical problems. The remaining nine plants will be shut down between now and 2022. The announcement was first made by Norbert Röttgen, head of the Federal Ministry for Environment, Nature Conservation and Nuclear Safety, after late-night talks.

Chancellor Angela Merkel said the phase-out of plants, previously scheduled to go offline as late as 2036, would give Germany a competitive advantage in the renewable energy era, stating, "As the first big industrialized nation, we can achieve such a transformation toward efficient and renewable energies, with all the opportunities that brings for exports, developing new technologies and jobs". Merkel also pointed to Japan's "helplessness" – despite being an industrialized, technologically advanced nation – in the face of its nuclear disaster. Some German manufacturers and energy companies have criticized the plans, warning that Germany could face blackouts. The Energiewende (Energy U-turn) policies have suffered from inadequate investment in power infrastructure to bring power to markets. The reduced dependence on nuclear power has resulted in higher consumption of fossil fuels and therefore of greenhouse gas production.

=== Italy ===
After the 1986 Chernobyl disaster Italy held a referendum, which supported shutting down Italy's four nuclear power plants. The construction of new reactors was halted and the last operating reactor was closed in 1990. In 1987, a moratorium on the construction of new nuclear plants was passed. Originally in effect until 1993, it had been extended until 2009. In 2004, a new energy law allowed joint ventures with foreign companies in relation to nuclear power plants and importing electricity from them. Following Silvio Berlusconi's victory in the 2008 election, Italy's industry minister announced that the government scheduled the construction to start the first new Italian nuclear-powered plant by 2013. On 24 February 2009, an agreement between France and Italy was signed according to which a study about the feasibility of building 4 new nuclear power plants in Italy to be conducted. On 9 July 2009 the Italian parliament passed a law on the establishment of a nuclear safety agency to be established by July 2010, and giving the government a task to select sites for new nuclear power plants. According to the 2010 Eurobarometer report only 20% of Italians support increase of the nuclear energy in the country's energy mix while 62% think that the share should be either maintained or reduced.

There was a uranium enrichment facility in Bosco Marengo that is now no longer operational and is being decommissioned by SOGIN.

=== Romania ===
Romania's 1,400 MW Cernavodă Nuclear Power Plant produces around 18% of the nation's electrical power. It is based on Canadian technology and uses heavy water produced at Drobeta-Turnu Severin as its neutron moderator and water from the Danube for cooling. Two reactors are fully operational and another three are partially finished. When fully functional the plant will produce around 40% of Romania's total electricity needs.

Currently, nuclear waste is stored at the reactors for up to ten years. Then the waste is transported to dry storage. The government has conducted studies into a permanent geological repository.

There are plans to construct a second nuclear power plant in Transylvania after 2020.

=== Russia ===
Russia operates 31 reactors, is building 3, and has plans for another 27. Russia has also begun building floating nuclear power plants. The £100 million ($204.9 million, 2 billion Rubles) vessel Akademik Lomonosov was completed in 2018, as the first of seven plants that Moscow says will bring vital energy to remote Russian regions. While producing only a small fraction of the power of a standard Russian land-based plant, it can supply power to a city of 200,000, or function as a desalination plant. The Rosatom, the state-owned nuclear energy company said that at least 12 countries were also interested in buying floating nuclear plants.

=== Serbia ===
Serbia presently doesn't have any nuclear power plants. Previously, Vinča Nuclear Institute operated two research reactors; RA and RB. The research reactors were supplied by the USSR. The larger of the two reactors was rated at 6.5 MW and used Soviet-supplied 80% enriched uranium fuel.

On 15 October 1958, there was a criticality accident at one of the research reactors. Six workers received large doses of radiation; one died shortly afterwards. The other five received the first ever bone marrow transplants in Europe.

The nuclear research programme ended in 1968, while the reactors were switched off in 1984.

After the 1986 Chernobyl disaster a nationwide campaign against usage of nuclear energy delivered a moratorium in a form of Law in 1989, which not only prohibited the construction of nuclear power plants, nuclear fuel fabrication and reprocessing facilities for used nuclear fuel but also criminalized any activity related to the aforementioned making it a criminal offense punishable by 5 years of prison.

After the break up of the former Yugoslavia a new law was adopted on 10 March 1995, which confirmed the previous moratorium, although it removed the controversial article related to the nuclear criminal offense.

Even though majority of people and politicians still support moratorium on usage of nuclear energy, past couple of years are marked with an increasing public campaign pointed towards repeal of the 1995 Law, or, at least, its limitation to 10 years, after which it would be possible to build nuclear reactors in Serbia.

=== Spain ===
In 1964, Spain began construction on its first of three nuclear reactors and completed construction in 1968. Currently, Spain has eight nuclear reactors producing 20% of the country's electricity or 7,442 net MWe.

=== Sweden ===
Sweden began research into nuclear energy in 1947 with the establishment of the atomic energy research organization. In 1964, the country built its first small heavy water reactor. The country decided to use hydropower and supplement it with nuclear energy to avoid the volatility in oil prices. Six reactors began commercial service in both the 1970s and 1980s, with one unit closed in 1999 and another in 2005. Currently, Sweden has 10 nuclear power reactors which provide over 40% of its electricity. On 17 June 2010, the Swedish Parliament adopted a decision allowing starting from 1 January 2011 a replacement of the existing reactors with new nuclear reactors.

=== Switzerland ===
Switzerland has five nuclear reactors, and around 40% of its electricity is generated by nuclear power. The country has had several referendums on the nuclear energy, beginning in 1979 with a citizens' initiative for nuclear safety, which was rejected. In 1984, there was a vote on an initiative "for a future without further nuclear power stations" with the result being a 55% to 45% vote against. On 23 September 1990, the people passed a motion to halt the construction of nuclear power plants (for a moratorium period of ten years) but rejected a motion to initiate a phase-out. On 18 May 2003 a motion calling for an extension to this moratorium (for another ten years) and another asking again on the question of a phase-out, were both rejected. In May 2011 the government decided it will phase out all nuclear power plants in the next twenty years

=== Ukraine ===
Ukraine operates 15 reactors, which supply 47.5% of Ukraine's electricity production of 195 billion kWh (2007). Ukraine's power sector is the twelfth-largest in the world in terms of installed capacity, with 54 gigawatts (GW). In 2006, the government planned to build 11 new reactors by the year 2030, in effect, almost doubling the current amount of nuclear power capacity.

=== United Kingdom ===
The first full-scale nuclear reactor in Europe opened in Calder Hall, located in Cumberland, United Kingdom on 17 October 1956. Calder Hall was the world's first nuclear power reactor producing power for a national grid, though its primary purpose was military plutonium production. At its peak, Calder Hall produced 240 MWe of electricity. Over the next ten years, nine more nuclear reactors were built across the United Kingdom. The UK has decommissioned nearly all of its first generation Magnox reactors. Recently, the UK privatized its nuclear energy industry but government oversight remains. As of 2010, the United Kingdom has 19 reactors generating 18% of the country's electricity. By current accounting lifetimes all but one of them will be decommissioned by 2023, though many are likely to be life-extended. The government is encouraging the building of new generation plants as replacements. About 2011, the reactors had a net capacity of 10,962 MWe. Currently (2024), the reactors have a net capacity of 5,883 MWe.

== North America ==
=== Canada ===
Canada operates 18 reactors accounting for about 15% of electrical generation, all in the province of Ontario except for one in New Brunswick. Increasing demands for electricity and environmental considerations have led Ontario to announce that it will maintain existing nuclear capacity by replacing older reactors with new ones. Canada has never had any serious accidents related to nuclear power, CANDU reactors are a particularly safe design. Canada is planning new reactors.

=== Mexico ===
Mexico has one nuclear power plant, the Laguna Verde nuclear power plant, which consists of two boiling water reactors. In February 2007, contracts with Iberdrola and Alstom were signed to update the reactors by 2010. A committee has been established to recommend on new nuclear plants and the most recent proposal is for one unit to come on line by 2015 with seven more to follow it by 2025.

After a period of inactivity, Mexico decided in 2007 to resume the use of Laguna Verde Nuclear Power Station. The two reactors were upgraded in production to 817MW each (from 683MW), accounting 4.6% of the electricity production. On 14 May 2010 Energy Secretary Georgina Kessel announced the intention of Mexico to include full development of nuclear energy as a means of diversifying its energy portfolio and provide an alternative to the use of fossil fuels.

In November 2011, Mexico abandoned plans to build as many as 10 new nuclear reactors in order to focus instead on natural gas-fired electricity plants after boosting discoveries of the fuel.

=== United States ===
In 2007, there were 104 (69 pressurized water reactors, 35 boiling water reactors) commercial nuclear generating units licensed to operate in the United States, producing approximately 20% of the country's electrical energy needs. In absolute terms, the United States is the world's largest supplier of commercial nuclear power. However, the development of nuclear power in the United States has been stymied ever since the Three Mile Island nuclear accident in 1979. Future development of nuclear power in the U.S. was to be enabled by the Energy Policy Act of 2005 and co-ordinated by the Nuclear Power 2010 Program, but many license applications filed with the Nuclear Regulatory Commission for proposed new reactors have been suspended or cancelled.

As of October 2011, plans for about 30 new reactors in the United States have been "whittled down to just four, despite the promise of large subsidies and President Barack Obama's support of nuclear power, which he reaffirmed after Fukushima". The only reactor currently under construction in America, at Watts Bar, Tennessee, was begun in 1973 and was completed in 2016. Matthew Wald from the New York Times has reported that "the nuclear renaissance is looking small and slow".

In 2008, the Energy Information Administration projected almost 17 gigawatts of new nuclear power reactors by 2030, but in its 2011 projections, it "scaled back the 2030 projection to just five". A survey conducted in April 2011 found that 64 percent of Americans opposed the construction of new nuclear reactors. A survey sponsored by the Nuclear Energy Institute, conducted in September 2011, found that "62 percent of respondents said they favor the use of nuclear energy as one of the ways to provide electricity in the United States, with 35 percent opposed".

== South America ==
=== Argentina ===
Argentina became the first Latin American country to operate a commercial nuclear power plant in 1974. As of 2026, Argentina operates three nuclear power reactors - Atucha 1, Atucha 2 and Embalse - with a combined capacity of approximately 1,631 MWe, generating around 7% of the country's electricity. The country is also pursuing further nuclear development through its domestically designed CAREM small modular reactor (SMR).

== Oceania ==
=== Australia ===
Australia has no nuclear power plants. However, Australia has up to 40% of the world's uranium deposits and is the world's second largest producer of uranium after Canada. At the same time Australia's extensive, low-cost coal and natural gas reserves have historically been used as strong arguments for avoiding nuclear power.

In 2005, the Australian government threatened to use its constitutional powers to take control of the approval process for new mines from the anti-nuclear Northern Territory government. They are also negotiating with China to weaken safeguard terms so as to allow uranium exports there. States controlled by the Australian Labor Party are blocking the development of new mines in their jurisdictions under the ALP's "No New Mines policy."

John Howard went to the 2007 Australian federal election with a pro-nuclear power platform but his government was defeated by Labor, which opposes nuclear power for Australia.

=== New Zealand ===
New Zealand has no nuclear power plants. It enacted the New Zealand Nuclear Free Zone, Disarmament, and Arms Control Act 1987 which prohibits the stationing of nuclear weapons on the territory of New Zealand and the entry into New Zealand waters of nuclear armed or propelled ships. This Act of Parliament, however, does not prevent the construction of nuclear power plants. A 2008 survey shows that relatively few New Zealanders favour nuclear power as the best energy source. However a 2005 survey of business leaders showed that nearly two-thirds supported investigation of nuclear power. A research reactor was operated by the University of Canterbury until 1981. A nuclear reactor provided electricity for McMurdo Station, in the New Zealand Antarctic Territory from 1962-1972. From the mid-1960s until the early 1980s official energy policy was that nuclear energy would be required. The Royal Commission on Nuclear Power Generation in New Zealand in its 1978 report said that there was no immediate need for New Zealand to embark upon a nuclear power program, but suggested that early in the 21st Century "a significant nuclear programme should be economically possible".

== See also ==
- Nuclear energy policy
- Nuclear power in the European Union
- Nuclear power by country
