= Nuclear energy by country =

Nuclear energy by country may refer to:

- Nuclear energy policy by country
- Nuclear power by country
