= RV-1 nuclear reactor =

Venezuelan nuclear reactor

RV-1
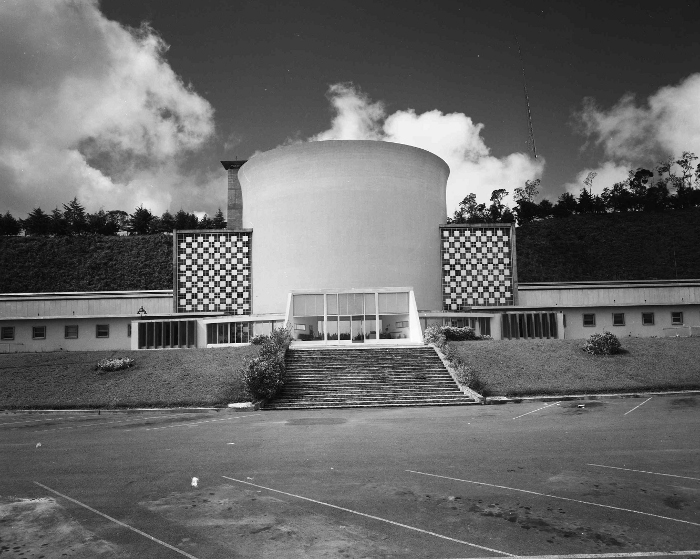
- Façade of the RV-1 Nuclear Reactor facility in the Venezuelan Institute for Scientific Research (IVIC)
- Reactor concept: Pool-type
- Status: Dismantled
- Location: Venezuela
- Coordinates: 10°23′51″N 66°59′03″W

Main parameters of the reactor core
- Fuel (fissile material): ^{235}U
- Primary moderator: Light water
- Primary coolant: Water

Reactor usage
- Primary use: Research
- Power (thermal): 3 MW
- Criticality (date): 12 July 1960
- Operator/owner: IVIC

The RV-1 nuclear reactor, now repurposed and known as Gamma rays sterilization plant ('Pegamma'; Spanish: Planta de Esterilización por Rayos Gamma), is a facility located in Altos Mirandinos, Miranda, Venezuela. It was the only nuclear reactor in Venezuela and one of the first reactors in Latin America. (Note: According to the IVIC, RV-1 was the first nuclear reactor in Latin America, other sources consider RA-1 Enrico Fermi (criticality in 1958) in Argentina as such. Consider also Brazilian IEA-R1 (criticality in 1957).) Currently, it is used as a gamma ray facility for microbiological sterilization of surgical supplies, packaging, medicine and dry food.

== Characteristics ==
The RV-1 was a pool-type material testing reactor (MTR) with a capacity of 3 megawatts of thermal power. It contained 20% enriched uranium as core fuel and used light water as both coolant and neutron moderator.

== History ==
During the regime of president Marcos Pérez Jiménez, Venezuela became member of the International Atomic Energy Agency after purchasing the RV-1 reactor from General Electric in 1956. The project was supported by the administration of United States President Dwight D. Eisenhower, to help promote the Atoms for Peace program, with the United States donating US$300,000 for the construction of the reactor. The reactor was constructed in the grounds of the Venezuelan Institute of Neurology and Brain Research (IVNIC, now known as IVIC - Venezuelan Institute for Scientific Research) under the supervision of Humberto Fernández-Morán; he never saw the project finished, as he went into exile after the Pérez Jiménez regime fell in 1958.

The reactor reached criticality in 1960 and was used for several decades to perform physics research, radiochemistry, production of radioisotopes and as neutron source. RV-1 was last operated in March 1991 and the decision to permanently shutdown the reactor was made in 1997. The core was later dismantled and sent back to the United States.

=== Repurposing and cancelled sequels ===
The Venezuelan government approved 2.1 million dollars to repurpose the reactor in 2010. Under the name 'Pegamma', IVIC received the authorization in 2004 to use the renewed reactor facility as an industrial irradiation plant, with a cobalt-60 gamma rays source with a capacity of 1 megacurie.

Venezuela later announced plans to build a nuclear power station in 2010. The government signed an agreement with Russia for the purchase and installation of two new nuclear reactors, but after the 2011 Fukushima Daiichi nuclear disaster in Japan, President Hugo Chávez announced a halt to plans on building a nuclear power plant.

== See also ==
- Nuclear energy in Venezuela
