= Nuclear power by country =

Timeline of commissioned and decommissioned nuclear capacity since the 1950s. Positive numbers show the commissioned capacity for each year; negative numbers show the decommissioned capacity for each year.

Global status of nuclear deployment as of May 2025 Operating reactors, building new reactors Operating reactors, planning new build No reactors, building new reactors No reactors, planning new build Operating reactors, stable Operating but may phase-out Civil nuclear power illegal No reactors

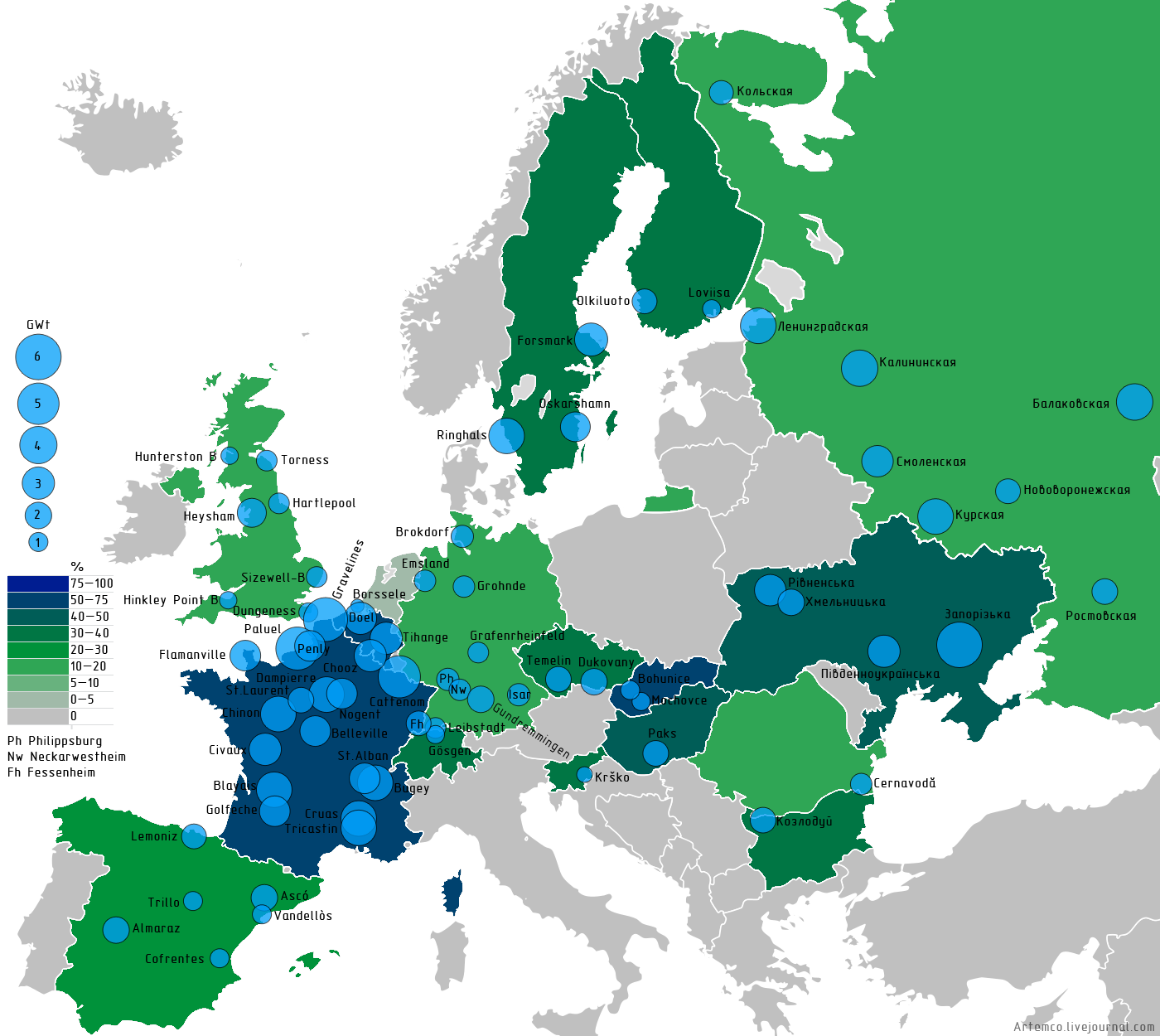
Nuclear power plants in Europe (including decommissioned nuclear power plants)

Nuclear power plants operate in 31 countries and generate about a tenth of the world's electricity. Most are in Europe, North America and East Asia. The United States is the largest producer of nuclear power, while France has the largest share of electricity generated by nuclear power, at about 65%.

Some countries operated nuclear reactors in the past but currently have no operating nuclear power plants. Among them, Italy closed all of its nuclear stations by 1990 and nuclear power has since been discontinued because of the 1987 referendums. Lithuania closed its RBMK reactor type nuclear station in 2009 for safety reasons. Kazakhstan phased out nuclear power in June 1999 but is planning to reintroduce it possibly by 2035 under referendum. Germany operated nuclear plants since 1960 until the completion of its phaseout policy in 2023. Taiwan completed its phaseout policy in 2025. Austria (Zwentendorf Nuclear Power Plant) and the Philippines (Bataan Nuclear Power Plant) both built a nuclear plant but never put it in use.

Sweden and Belgium originally had phase-out policies however they have now moved away from their original plans. The Philippines relaunched their nuclear programme on February 28, 2022, and may try to operate the 1984 mothballed Bataan Plant.

As of 2020, Poland was in advanced planning phase for 1.5 GW and planned to have up to 9 GW by 2040. Hong Kong has no nuclear power plants within its boundary, but imports 80% of the electricity generated from Daya Bay Nuclear Power Station located across the border, in which the power company of the territory holds stake. In 2021, Iraq declared it was planning to build 8 nuclear reactors by 2030 to supply up to 25% electric power in a grid that was suffering from shortages.

== Overview ==
Of the 31 countries in which nuclear power plants operate, only France, Slovakia, Belgium and Ukraine use them as the source for a majority of the country's electricity supply as of 2026. Other countries have significant amounts of nuclear power generation capacity. By far the largest nuclear electricity producers are the United States with 781,945 GWh of nuclear electricity in 2026, followed by China with 467,019 GWh. As of August 2026, 427 reactors with a net capacity of 376,261 MWe were operational, and 75 reactors with net capacity of 66,190 MWe were under construction. Of the reactors under construction, 41 reactors with 39,755 MWe were in China.

Nuclear power by country
Country	Reactors			Capacity (MW)	Generation (GWh)	% total	Capacity factor	Notes
Country	In use	Suspended	Being built	Capacity (MW)	Generation (GWh)	% total	Capacity factor	Notes
World	428	23	75	379,000	2,617,530	8.5%	84.6%	
United States	94	0	0	96,952	781,945	18.2%	92.5%	
China	65	0	41	65,085	467,019	4.82%	93.11%	
France	57	0	0	63,000	364,390	67.3%	74.2%	
Russia	37	0	4	27,727	202,104	17.8%	85.3%	
South Korea	26	0	2	25,609	179,407	31.7%	79.6%	
India	20	4	6	6,920	49,910	3.3%	84.4%	
Canada	19	0	1	13,744	81,156	13.4%	68.2%	
Japan	15	18	2	31,679	84,887	10.0%	33.0%	
Ukraine	15	0	2	13,107	81,126	55.0%	71.0%	(Note: From 2021 before the Russian invasion)
United Kingdom	9	0	2	5,883	37,295	12.3%	72.7%	
Spain	7	0	0	7,123	52,129	19.9%	88.5%	(Note: Phase-out planned)
Sweden	6	0	0	7,008	48,697	29.1%	82.5%	
Pakistan	6	1	2	3,262	22,783	16.7%	86.4%	
(Czech Republic) Czechia	6	0	0	3,963	28,049	40.2%	81.4%	
Slovakia	6	0	0	2,302	16,958	60.6%	87.8%	
Belgium	5	0	0	3,908	29,732	57.3%	86.9%	
Finland	5	0	0	4,369	31,128	39.1%	84.1%	
Hungary	4	0	0	1,916	15,163	47.1%	90.6%	
Switzerland	4	0	0	2,973	23,033	28.6%	89.3%	(Note: Gradual phase-out planned)
United Arab Emirates	4	0	0	5,348	36,504	21.8%	89.5%	
Argentina	3	0	1	1,641	10,449	7.4%	72.5%	
Brazil	2	0	1	1,884	14,862	2.3%	89.7%	
Belarus	2	0	0	2,220	14,735	36.3%	77.0%	
Bulgaria	2	0	0	2,006	15,110	41.6%	85.1%	
Mexico	2	0	0	1,552	11,978	4.8%	90.8%	
Romania	2	0	0	1,300	10,044	19.8%	90.7%	
South Africa	2	0	0	1,854	7,835	3.9%	47.6%	
Iran	1	0	1	915	6,439	1.7%	78.7%	
Netherlands	1	0	0	482	3,385	2.8%	80.3%	
Armenia	1	0	0	416	2,629	30.8%	72.5%	
Slovenia	1	0	0	696	5,551	35.0%	91.1%	(Note: One reactor (Krško Nuclear Power Plant) located within Slovenia is co-owned by and shared between Croatia and Slovenia.)
Egypt	0	0	4	4,400	—N/a	—N/a	—N/a	
Turkey	0	0	4	4,456	—N/a	—N/a	—N/a	
Bangladesh	1	0	1	2,160	—N/a	—N/a	—N/a	

== See also ==
- List of commercial nuclear reactors
- List of countries by uranium reserves
- List of nuclear power accidents by country
- List of nuclear power stations
- Nuclear energy policy by country
- World Nuclear Industry Status Report
