= Nuclear power in Venezuela =

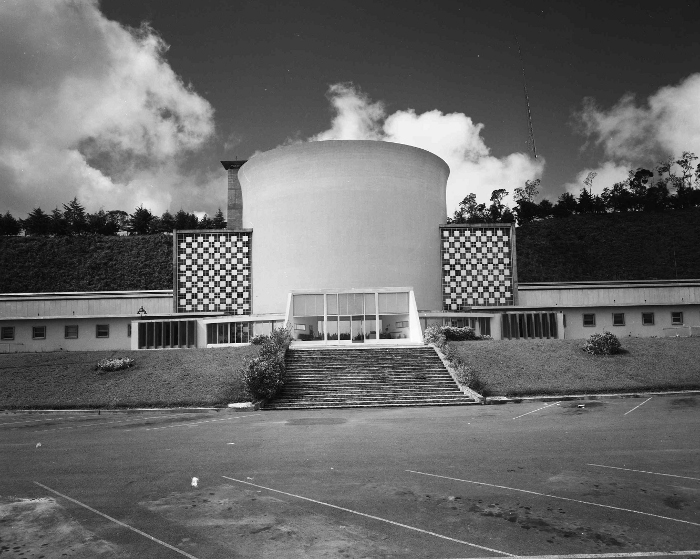
Façade of the RV-1 nuclear reactor facility in the Venezuelan Institute for Scientific Research (IVIC)

The nuclear energy programs of Venezuela started during the 1950s but currently there are no active nuclear power facilities. Most of Venezuela's nuclear science activities are carried out at Venezuelan Institute for Scientific Research (IVIC).

Venezuela does not mine radioactive minerals, but the government estimates that 50 tonnes of unexploited uranium ore are available in the country.

== Historical facilities ==
During the regime of president Marcos Pérez Jiménez, the RV-1 nuclear reactor at IVIC, was commissioned under the supervision of Humberto Fernández-Morán. The reactor was purchased from General Electric in 1956 and could produce up to 3 MW of power. The reactor reached criticality in 1960 and was shut down in 1994.

== International treaties ==
Venezuela became a member of the International Atomic Energy Agency in August 1957, and signed the Treaty of Tlatelolco in 1967, under which, the states parties agree to prohibit and prevent the test and creation of nuclear weapons. Venezuela also signed the Treaty on the Non-Proliferation of Nuclear Weapons (NPT) in 1975 and negotiated IAEA Safeguards Agreements covering all its nuclear activities in March 1982.

In 2017, Venezuela signed the Treaty on the Prohibition of Nuclear Weapons of the United Nations.

Other deals include a memorandum of understanding with Brazil on cooperation in the peaceful uses of nuclear energy of July 1979, followed by a mutual nuclear reactor research project in November 1983. In 2007, an article in newspaper O Estado de S. Paulo reported that uranium mining technology, developed by the Brazilian National Nuclear Energy Commission (CNEN) was transferred to Venezuela.

== Cancelled projects ==
In 2010, Venezuela announced plans to build a nuclear power station, with support from Russia. Venezuela signed two pacts with Russia, one for mutual collaboration on nuclear energy and a second on for the purchase and installation of two nuclear reactors: a research reactor to be used for medical and scientific purposes and a nuclear power plant.

After the 2011 Fukushima Daiichi nuclear disaster in Japan, Venezuelan President Hugo Chávez announced a halt to plans on building a nuclear power plant.

The agreement with Russia included the training of students in Russia to increase specialized personnel. Many Venezuelan students followed postgraduate studies in Russia until the termination of the training program in 2017.
