= Nuclear power in Kenya =

In 2017, the Nuclear Power and Energy Agency (NuPEA), formerly Kenya Nuclear Electricity Board (KNEB), estimated that a 1,000 MW nuclear plant could be operational by 2027 and cost Ksh500-600 billion (US$5-$6 billion), to be located near a large body of water, such as the Indian Ocean, Lake Victoria or Lake Turkana.

== Background ==
In September 2010 Former Energy and Petroleum Ministry PS Patrick Nyoike announced that Kenya aimed to build a 1,000 MW nuclear power plant between 2017 and 2022. The projected cost using South Korean technology was US$3.5 billion. Nuclear and renewable sources of energy such as wind, solar and geothermal plants could play a major role in helping Kenya achieve middle income status, as the reduction of carbon emissions becomes a higher priority.

== Nuclear energy programme ==
Kenya has embarked on a programme to see the country generate 1 GW (1,000 MW) from nuclear sources between 2020 and 2022. It was planned that by 2030 Kenya would have installed a capacity of 4 GW of nuclear energy, generating about 19% of Kenya's energy needs, meaning that nuclear power would be the second-largest source of energy in Kenya coming second after geothermal power, a clean form of energy.

The NuPEA is in charge of spearheading this sector in the country.

== See also ==
- Geothermal power in Kenya
- Wind power in Kenya
