= Nuclear power in Bangladesh =

Nuclear power stations in Bangladesh (view)
Under construction
Planned plants

Bangladesh first conceived building a nuclear power plant in 1961. The Bangladesh Atomic Energy Commission was established in 1973. The country currently operates a TRIGA research reactor at the Atomic Energy Research Establishment in Savar.

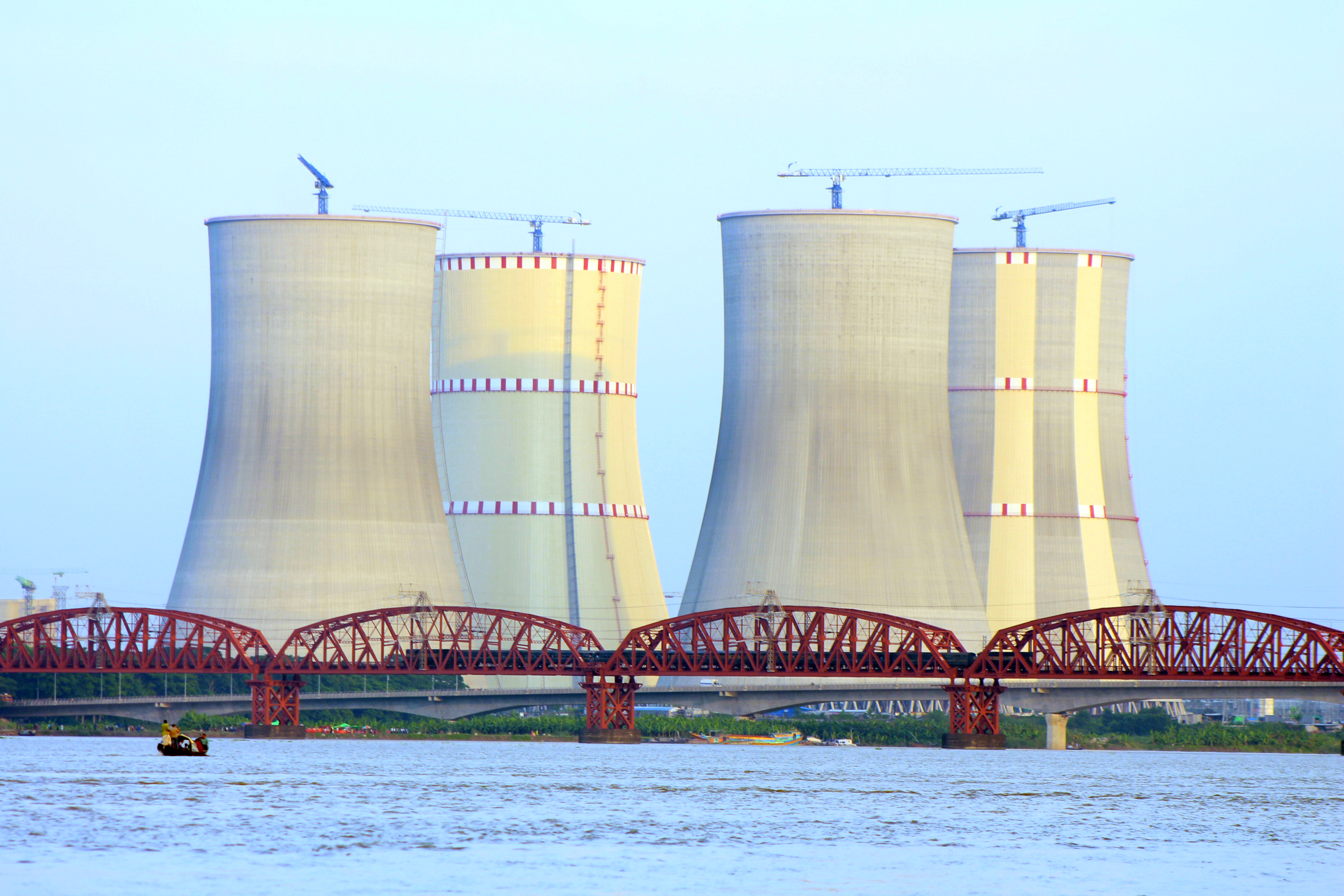
Rooppur Nuclear Power Plant, Rooppur, Pabna

More recently, in 2001, Bangladesh adopted a national Nuclear Power Action Plan. On 24 June 2007, the country's government announced plans to build a nuclear power plant to meet electricity shortages. In May 2010, Bangladesh entered into a civilian nuclear agreement with Russia (also known as the Russian Federation). It also has framework agreements for peaceful nuclear energy applications with China, France, the United Kingdom and South Korea. Additionally, Bangladesh maintains nuclear energy agreement with the United States and receives nuclear assistance from Japan.

In February 2011, Bangladesh reached an agreement with Russia to build the 2,400 megawatt (MW) Ruppur Nuclear Power Plant with two reactors, each of which will generate 1,200 MW of power. The nuclear power plant will be built at Rooppur, on the banks of the Padma River, in the Ishwardi subdistrict of Pabna, in the northwest of the country.

The inter-governmental agreement (IGA) was officially signed on 2 November 2011. Estimated cost of the contract is US$12.65 billion. As per the Revised Annual Development Programme for 2024-2025, a total of BDT 73,746.06 crore had been spent on the project by June 2024.

On 29 May 2013, Bangladesh's Prime Minister declared that a second 2 GW nuclear power plant will be constructed in the southern region of the country. In 2019, site selection was still in progress, with a focus on the coastal region at the Bay of Bengal.

Bangladesh received the first shipment of uranium fuel from Russia for its first nuclear power station in October 2023, making it the world's 33rd nuclear energy producer.

On 28 April 2026, fuel loading began at unit-1 of the Rooppur plant, transitioning the project into the commissioning phase. The reactor reached its first criticality in October 2026, with full 1,200 MW output from the first unit anticipated by early 2027.

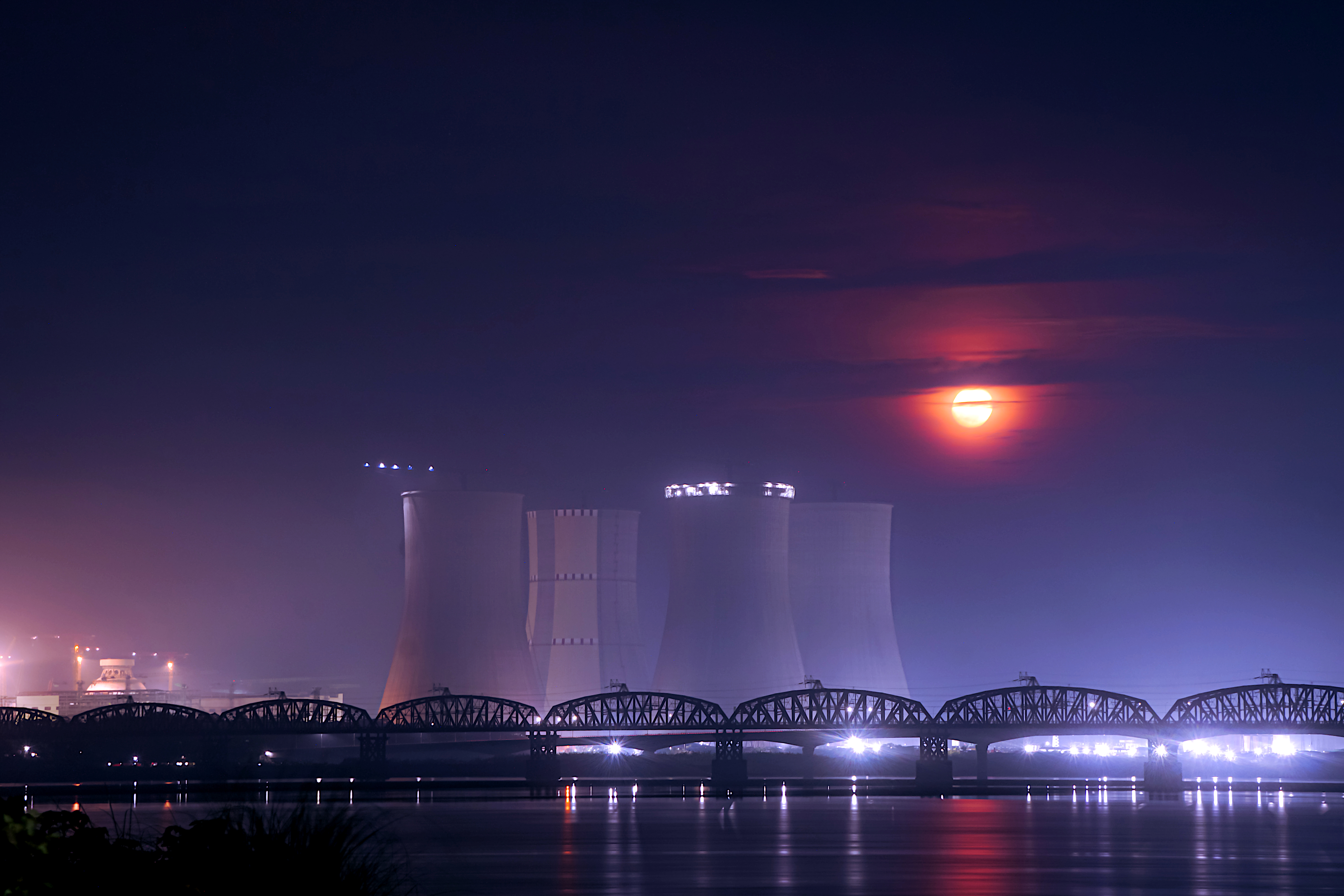
Rooppur Nuclear Power Plant, Hardinge Bridge, and Lalon Shah Bridge at the same frame on a moonlit night

== Waste disposal ==
There are arguments in favour of nuclear energy when compared to the use of coal.

Nuclear waste disposal will be managed by Radioactive Waste Management Company, to be formed according to Bangladesh government's National Policy on Radioactive Waste and Spent Nuclear Fuel Management-2019. Bangladesh plans to store nuclear waste for a given period, after which the waste will be sent to Russia. Spent fuel may be reprocessed in Russia for fast breeder reactors.

=== Costs ===
As of 2018, the estimated cost for waste management, disposal, and decommissioning has not been released.
