= Nuclear energy policy =

Eight German nuclear power reactors (Biblis A and B, Brunsbuettel, Isar 1, Kruemmel, Neckarwestheim 1, Philippsburg 1 and Unterweser) were permanently shutdown on 6 August 2011, following the Fukushima Daiichi Nuclear Disaster in Japan.

Nuclear energy policy is a national and international policy concerning some or all aspects of nuclear energy and the nuclear fuel cycle, such as uranium mining, ore concentration, conversion, enrichment for nuclear fuel, generating electricity by nuclear power, storing and reprocessing spent nuclear fuel, and disposal of radioactive waste. Nuclear energy policies often include the regulation of energy use and standards relating to the nuclear fuel cycle. Other measures include efficiency standards, safety regulations, emission standards, fiscal policies, and legislation on energy trading, transport of nuclear waste and contaminated materials, and their storage. Governments might subsidize nuclear energy and arrange international treaties and trade agreements about the import and export of nuclear technology, electricity, nuclear waste, and uranium.

Since about 2001 the term nuclear renaissance has been used to refer to a possible nuclear power industry revival, but nuclear electricity generation in 2012 was at its lowest level since 1999. Since then it had increased back to 2,653 TWh in 2021, a level last seen in 2006. The share of nuclear power in electricity production however is at a historic low and now below 10% down from a maximum of 17.5% in 1996.

Following the March 2011 Fukushima I nuclear accidents, China, Germany, Switzerland, Israel, Malaysia, Thailand, United Kingdom, and the Philippines are reviewing their nuclear power programs. Indonesia and Vietnam still plan to build nuclear power plants. Thirty-one countries operate nuclear power stations, and there are a considerable number of new reactors being built in China, South Korea, India, and Russia. As of June 2011, countries such as Australia, Austria, Denmark, Greece, Ireland, Latvia, Liechtenstein, Luxembourg, Malta, Portugal, Israel, Malaysia, and Norway have no nuclear power stations and remain opposed to nuclear power.

Since nuclear energy and nuclear weapons technologies are closely related, military aspirations can act as a factor in energy policy decisions. The fear of nuclear proliferation influences some international nuclear energy policies.

== The global picture ==
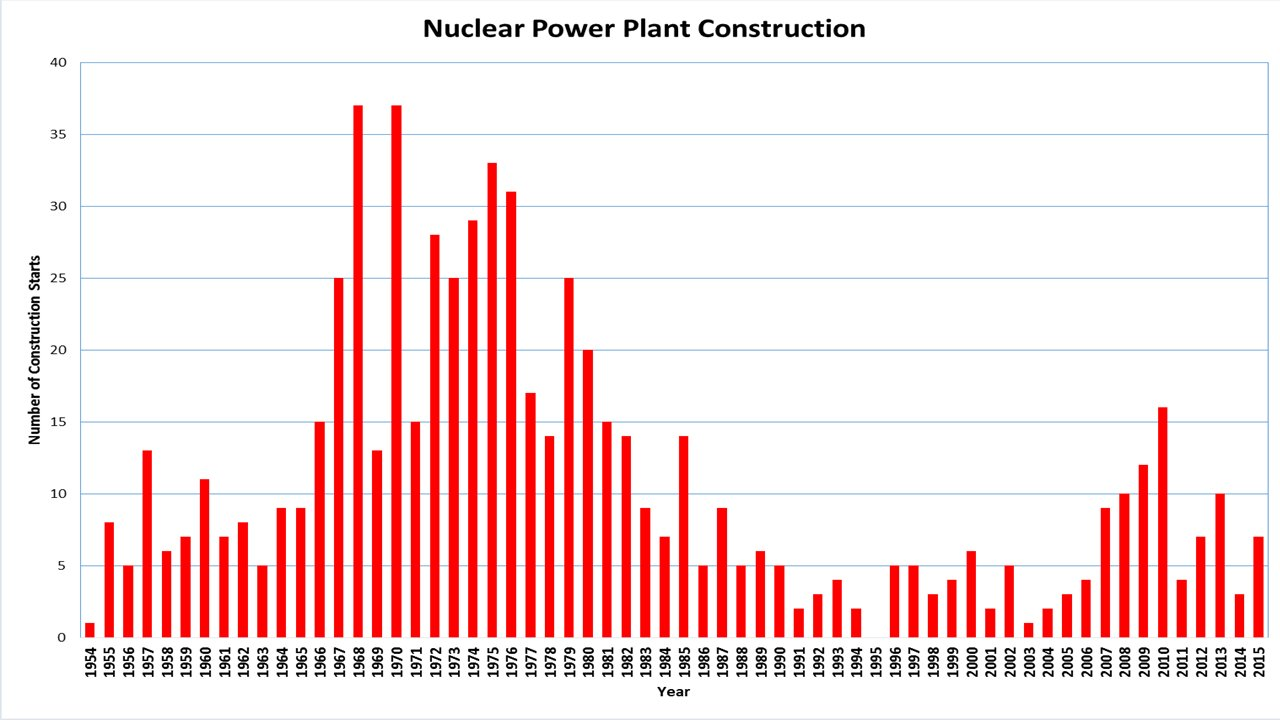
The number of nuclear power plant constructions started each year, from 1954 to 2013. Note the increase in new constructions from 2007 to 2010, before a decline following the 2011 Fukushima Daiichi nuclear disaster.

After 1986's Chernobyl disaster, public fear of nuclear power led to a virtual halt in reactor construction, and several countries decided to phase out nuclear power altogether. However, increasing energy demand was believed to require new sources of electric power, and rising fossil fuel prices coupled with concerns about greenhouse gas emissions (see Climate change mitigation) have sparked heightened interest in nuclear power and predictions of a nuclear renaissance.

In 2004, the largest producer of nuclear energy was the United States with 28% of worldwide capacity, followed by France (18%) and Japan (12%). In 2007, 31 countries operated nuclear power plants. In September 2008 the IAEA projected nuclear power to remain at a 12.4% to 14.4% share of the world's electricity production through 2030.

After the 2011 Fukushima Daiichi nuclear disaster some countries decided to permanently shut down their nuclear power reactors and fewer nuclear power plants constructions were constructed in the following years.

Asia is expected to be the primary growth market for nuclear energy in the foreseeable future. As of 2025, 80% of nuclear reactors under construction globally are in Asia.

== Policy issues ==
=== Nuclear concerns ===
Nuclear accidents and radioactive waste disposal are major concerns. Other concerns include nuclear proliferation, the high cost of nuclear power plants, and nuclear terrorism.

=== Energy security ===
For some countries, nuclear power affords energy independence. In the words of the French, "We have no coal, we have no oil, we have no gas, we have no choice." Japan—similarly lacking in indigenous natural resources for power supply—relied on nuclear power for 1/3 of its energy mix prior to the Fukushima nuclear disaster; since March 2011, Japan has sought to offset the loss of nuclear power with increased reliance on imported liquefied natural gas, which has led to the country's first trade deficits in decades. Therefore, the discussion of a future for nuclear energy is intertwined with a discussion of energy security and the use of energy mix, including renewable energy development.

Nuclear power has been relatively unaffected by embargoes, and uranium is mined in "reliable" countries, including Australia and Canada.

Many commentators have criticized Germany's Energiewende policy, which involved shutting down its nuclear power plants after the Fukushima disaster and relying instead on renewable energy sources. This transition made the country heavily dependent on Russian gas. In response to Russia's decision to cut gas supplies, Germany has increased coal production while keeping two nuclear plants on standby.

=== Nuclear energy history and trends ===
Predictions by the nuclear industry of their capabilities were often optimistic through the 20th century.

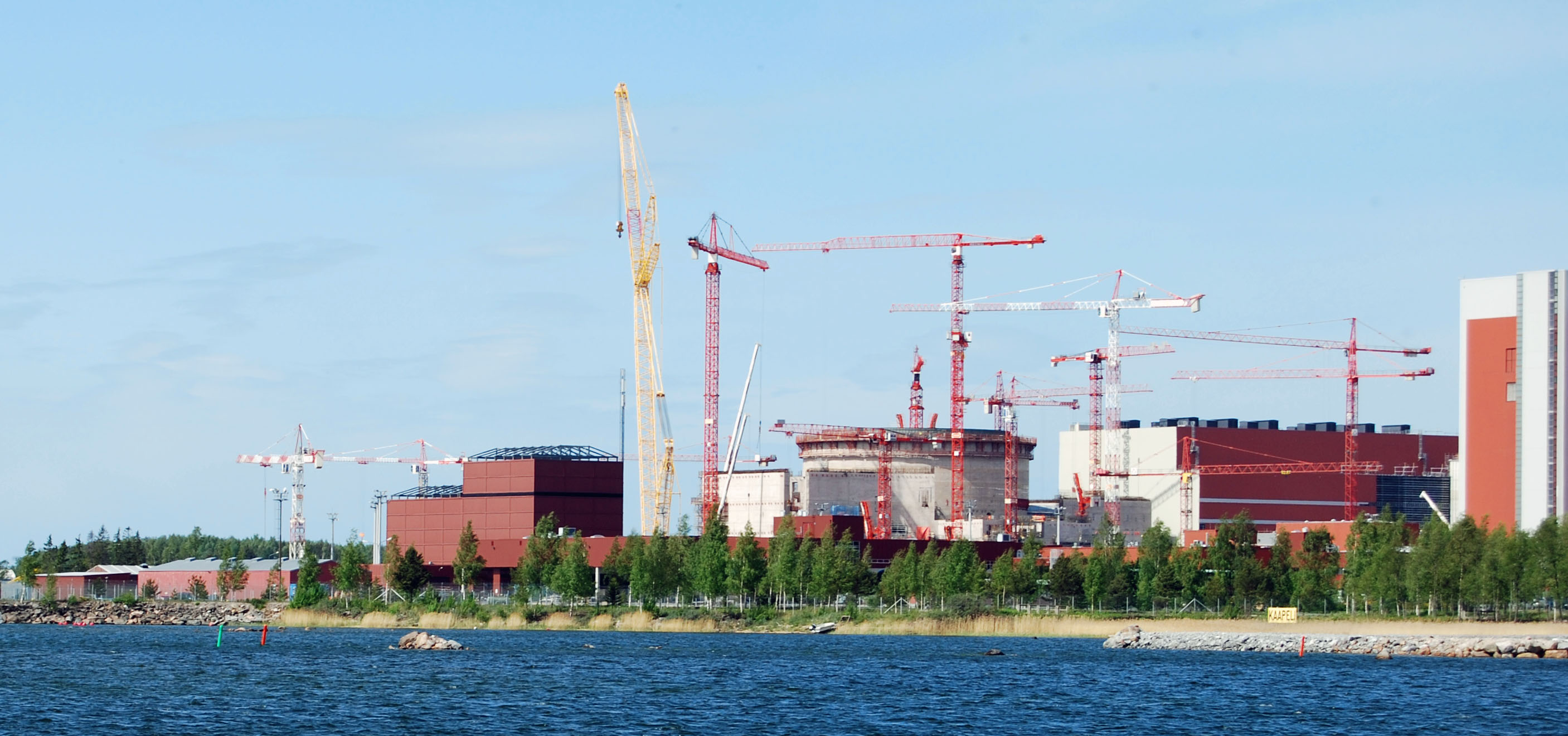
Olkiluoto 3 under construction in 2009. It is the first EPR design, but problems with workmanship and supervision have created costly delays which led to an inquiry by the Finnish nuclear regulator STUK. In December 2012, Areva estimated that the full cost of building the reactor will be about €8.5 billion, or almost three times the original delivery price of €3 billion.

Since about 2001 the term nuclear renaissance has been used to refer to a possible nuclear power industry revival, driven by rising fossil fuel prices and new concerns about meeting greenhouse gas emission limits. However, nuclear electricity generation in 2012 was at its lowest level since 1999, and new reactors under construction in Finland and France, which were meant to lead a nuclear renaissance, have been delayed and are running over-budget. China has 32 new reactors under construction, and there are also a considerable number of new reactors being built in South Korea, India, and Russia. At the same time, at least 100 older and smaller reactors will "most probably be closed over the next 10-15 years". So the expanding nuclear programs in Asia are balanced by retirements of aging plants and nuclear reactor phase-outs.

In March 2011 the nuclear emergencies at Japan's Fukushima I Nuclear Power Plant and shutdowns at other nuclear facilities raised questions among some commentators over the future of the renaissance. Platts has reported that "the crisis at Japan's Fukushima nuclear plants has prompted leading energy-consuming countries to review the safety of their existing reactors and cast doubt on the speed and scale of planned expansions around the world". China, Germany, Switzerland, Israel, Malaysia, Thailand, United Kingdom, Italy and the Philippines have reviewed their nuclear power programs. Indonesia and Vietnam still plan to build nuclear power plants. Countries such as Australia, Austria, Denmark, Greece, Ireland, Latvia, Liechtenstein, Luxembourg, Portugal, Israel, Malaysia, New Zealand, and Norway remain opposed to nuclear power. Following the Fukushima I nuclear accidents, the International Energy Agency halved its estimate of additional nuclear generating capacity built by 2035.

Following the Fukushima nuclear disaster, Germany permanently shut down eight of its reactors and planned to close the remaining by 2022. In 2011 Siemens exited the nuclear power sector following the changes to German energy policy, and supported the German government's planned energy transition to renewable energy technologies. The Italians voted overwhelmingly to keep their country non-nuclear. Switzerland and Spain have banned the construction of new reactors. Belgium decided to phase out its nuclear plants.

In 2012 a new safety plan for nuclear power was approved by State Council, and full incorporation of International Atomic Energy Agency (IAEA) safety standards became explicit. In the 13th Five-Year Plan from 2016, six to eight nuclear reactors were to be approved each year. A draft of the 14th Five-Year Plan (2021-2025) released in March 2021 showed government plans to reach 70 GWe gross of nuclear capacity by the end of 2025.

In March 2018, the government stated that nuclear capacity would fall well short of its 63 GWe target and that the total nuclear capacity is likely to be about 22.5 GWe by the year 2031.

Following IPCC announcements climate concerns again started to dominate world opinion. With rising oil and gas prices in 2022, many countries are reconsidering nuclear power.

In October 2021 the Japanese cabinet approved the new Plan for Electricity Generation to 2030 prepared by the Agency for Natural Resources and Energy (ANRE) and an advisory committee, following public consultation. The nuclear target for 2030 of 20-22% is unchanged from that in the 2015 plan, but renewables increase greatly to 36-38%, including geothermal and hydro. Hydrogen and ammonia are included at 1%. The plan would require the restart of another ten reactors. Prime minister Fumio Kishida in July 2022 announced that the country should consider building advanced reactors and extending operating licences beyond 60 years.

In March 2022 Belgium delayed its plans to phase out nuclear energy by a decade. The prime minister said that two reactors (Doel 4 and Tihange 3) would continue operating to 2035 to “strengthen our county’s independence from fossil fuels in a turbulent geopolitical environment.” In June Engie said it was seeking financial aid from the government for the continued operation of the two reactors.

=== Climate Change and the Energy Transition ===
Eliminating fossil fuels is essential in solving the climate change crisis. Nuclear power has one of the lowest life-cycle greenhouse gas emissions. Historically, nuclear power has prevented 64 gigatonnes of CO_{2}-equivalent greenhouse-gas emissions between 1971 and 2009. With a significant amount of renewable energy installed in the 21st century, it has been speculated that tensions between nuclear and renewable national energy development strategies might reduce their effectiveness in terms of climate change mitigation. However, newer studies have refuted this idea. Both nuclear and renewable energy have shown equally effective in the prevention of greenhouse-gas emissions. An effective climate-change mitigation strategy may include both nuclear and renewable energy sources. In 2018 the IPCC provided advice to policymakers giving four illustrative model pathways to limit warming to 1.5 degrees. In each of these pathways nuclear energy generation increased between 98% and 501% over 2010 levels by 2050.

In 2021 the European Union Joint Research Centre issued the results of its study on whether nuclear power generation meets the criteria of its Green Taxonomy. The analyses did not reveal any science-based evidence that nuclear energy does more harm to human health or to the environment than other electricity production technologies already included in the EU Green Taxonomy as activities supporting climate change mitigation. As a result of this assessment, the EU Parliament voted to include nuclear energy in its Green Taxonomy.

Moreover, nuclear energy has such a low carbon footprint that it could power carbon dioxide capture and transformation, resulting in a carbon-negative process. Specifically, various organizations are working across the globe to create designs for small modular reactors, a type of nuclear fission reactor that is smaller than conventional reactors. Some of these companies include ARC Nuclear in Canada, CNEA in Denmark, Areva TA in France, Toshiba and JAERI in Japan, OKB Gidropress in Russia, and OPEN100 and X-energy in the United States.

== See also ==
- Anti-nuclear movement
- Energy development
- Energy economics
- Fossil fuels phase-out
- List of anti-nuclear groups
- List of countries with nuclear weapons
- List of energy topics
- Nuclear energy policy of the United States
- Nuclear free zone
- Nuclear power by country
- Nuclear power in France
- Nuclear power phase-out
- Pro-nuclear movement
- Renewable energy commercialization
- Vulnerability of nuclear plants to attack
- World Nuclear Industry Status Report
