= Energy policy =

How a government or business deals with energy

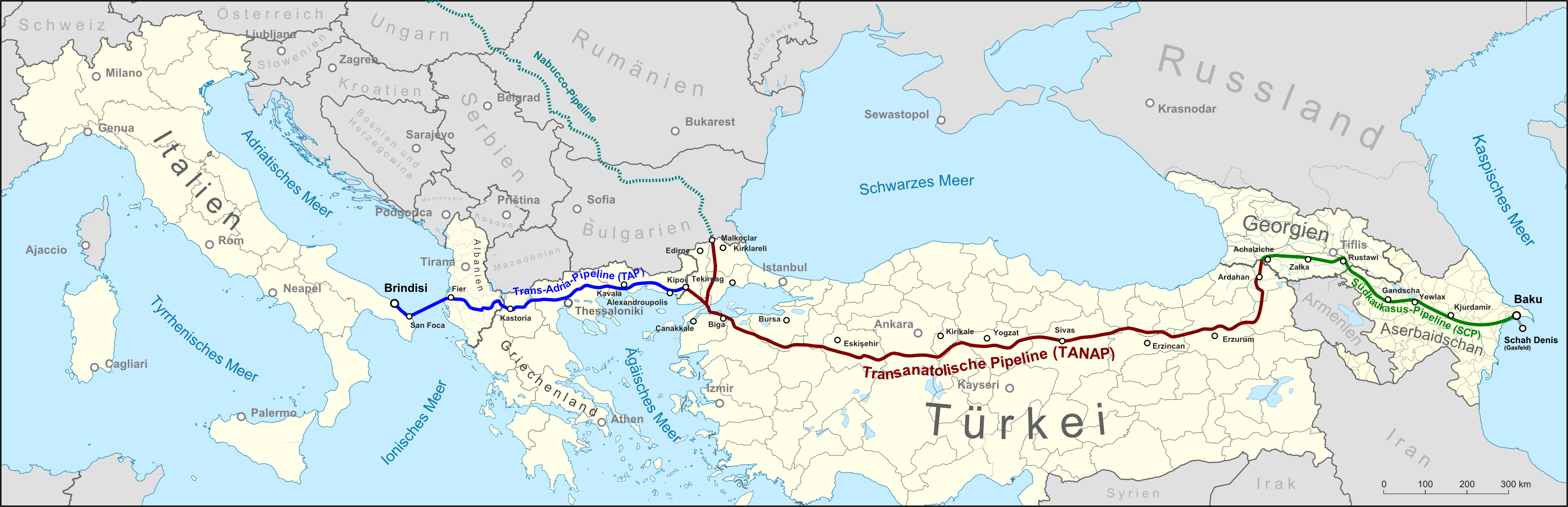
Example of energy policy decisions: The goal of the Southern Gas Corridor, which connects the giant Shah Deniz gas field in Azerbaijan to Europe, is to reduce Europe's dependency on Russian gas.

Energy policies are the government's strategies and decisions regarding the production, distribution, and consumption of energy within a specific jurisdiction. Energy is essential for the functioning of modern economies because they require energy for many sectors, such as industry, transport, agriculture, housing. The main components of energy policy include legislation, international treaties, energy subsidies and other public policy techniques.

The energy sector emits more greenhouse gas worldwide than any other sector. Therefore, energy policies are closely related to climate policies. These decisions affect how high the greenhouse gas emissions by that country are.

The main components of energy policy include:

- Legislation and regulation – Governments implement laws to promote renewable energy, set efficiency standards, and regulate fossil fuel extraction.
- International treaties – Agreements like the Paris Climate Accord influence national energy strategies by setting emission reduction targets.
- Subsidies and incentives – Many governments provide financial support for clean energy technologies while phasing out fossil fuel subsidies.
- Public policy techniques – These include carbon pricing, renewable portfolio standards, and energy efficiency mandates.

The energy sector is the largest contributor to global greenhouse gas (GHG) emissions, accounting for over 73% of total CO_{2} emissions worldwide. As a result, energy policies are intrinsically linked to climate policies. Decisions regarding energy infrastructure—such as reliance on coal versus renewables—determine a nation's carbon footprint and its ability to meet international climate commitments (Intergovernmental Panel on Climate Change. For instance, countries investing in wind, solar, and nuclear energy typically achieve faster decarbonization than those dependent on coal and oil.

Given the urgency of climate change, many nations are transitioning toward low-carbon energy systems through policies like the U.S. Inflation Reduction Act (IRA) and the European Green Deal, which incentivize renewable energy adoption while reducing fossil fuel dependence.

== Purposes ==
Access to energy is critical for basic social needs, such as lighting, heating, cooking, and healthcare. Given the importance of energy, the price of energy has a direct effect on jobs, economic productivity, business competitiveness, and the cost of goods and services.

Frequently the dominant issue of energy policy is the risk of supply-demand mismatch (see: energy crisis). Current energy policies also address environmental issues (see: climate change), particularly challenging because of the need to reconcile global objectives and international rules with domestic needs and laws.

The "human dimensions" of energy use are of increasing interest to business, utilities, and policymakers. Using the social sciences to gain insights into energy consumer behavior can help policymakers to make better decisions about broad-based climate and energy options. This could facilitate more efficient energy use, renewable-energy commercialization, and carbon-emission reductions.

== Approaches ==
The attributes of energy policy may include legislation, international treaties, incentives to investment, guidelines for energy conservation, taxation and other public policy techniques. Economic and energy modelling can be used by governmental or inter-governmental bodies as an advisory and analysis tool.

Energy planning is more detailed than energy policy.

=== National energy policy ===
Some governments state an explicit energy policy. Others do not but in any case, each government practices some type of energy policy. A national energy policy comprises a set of measures involving that country's laws, treaties and agency directives.

There are a number of elements that are contained in a national energy policy. Some important elements intrinsic to an energy policy include:

- What is the extent of energy self-sufficiency for this nation
- Where future energy sources will derive
- How future energy will be consumed (e.g. among sectors)
- What are the goals for future energy intensity, ratio of energy consumed to GDP
- How can the national policy drive province, state and municipal functions
- What specific mechanisms (e.g. taxes, incentives, manufacturing standards) are in place to implement the total policy
- Do you want to develop and promote a plan for how to get the world to net zero emissions?
- What fiscal policies related to energy products and services should be used (taxes, exemptions, subsidies, etc.)?
- What legislation affecting energy use, such as efficiency standards, emission standards, is needed?

=== Relationship to other government policies ===
Energy policy sometimes dominates and sometimes is dominated by other government policies. For example energy policy may dominate, supplying free coal to poor families and schools thus supporting social policy, but thus causing air pollution and so impeding heath policy and environmental policy. On the other hand energy policy may be dominated by defense policy, for example some counties started building expensive nuclear power plants to supply material for bombs. Or defense policy may be dominated for a while, eventually resulting in stranded assets, such as Nord Stream 2.

Energy policy is closely related to climate change policy because totalled worldwide the energy sector emits more greenhouse gas than other sectors.

Energy policy decisions are sometimes not taken democratically.

=== Corporate energy policy ===
In 2019, some companies "have committed to set climate targets across their operations and value chains aligned with limiting global temperature rise to 1.5°C above pre-industrial levels and reaching net-zero emissions by no later than 2050". Corporate power purchase agreements can kickstart renewable energy projects, but the energy policies of some countries do not allow or discourage them.

== By type of energy ==
=== Nuclear energy ===
Nuclear energy policy is a national and international policy concerning some or all aspects of nuclear energy and the nuclear fuel cycle, such as uranium mining, ore concentration, conversion, enrichment for nuclear fuel, generating electricity by nuclear power, storing and reprocessing spent nuclear fuel, and disposal of radioactive waste. Nuclear energy policies often include the regulation of energy use and standards relating to the nuclear fuel cycle. Other measures include efficiency standards, safety regulations, emission standards, fiscal policies, and legislation on energy trading, transport of nuclear waste and contaminated materials, and their storage. Governments might subsidize nuclear energy and arrange international treaties and trade agreements about the import and export of nuclear technology, electricity, nuclear waste, and uranium.

Since about 2001 the term nuclear renaissance has been used to refer to a possible nuclear power industry revival, but nuclear electricity generation in 2012 was at its lowest level since 1999. Since then it had increased back to 2,653 TWh in 2021, a level last seen in 2006. The share of nuclear power in electricity production however is at a historic low and now below 10% down from a maximum of 17.5% in 1996.

Following the March 2011 Fukushima I nuclear accidents, China, Germany, Switzerland, Israel, Malaysia, Thailand, United Kingdom, and the Philippines are reviewing their nuclear power programs. Indonesia and Vietnam still plan to build nuclear power plants. Thirty-one countries operate nuclear power stations, and there are a considerable number of new reactors being built in China, South Korea, India, and Russia. As of June 2011, countries such as Australia, Austria, Denmark, Greece, Ireland, Latvia, Liechtenstein, Luxembourg, Malta, Portugal, Israel, Malaysia, and Norway have no nuclear power stations and remain opposed to nuclear power.

Since nuclear energy and nuclear weapons technologies are closely related, military aspirations can act as a factor in energy policy decisions. The fear of nuclear proliferation influences some international nuclear energy policies.

=== Renewable energy ===
Though the share of electricity generation from renewables has increased since 2010, there is substantial variance among major world regions.

Public policy has a role to play in renewable energy commercialization because the free market system has some fundamental limitations. As the Stern Review points out: "In a liberalised energy market, investors, operators and consumers should face the full cost of their decisions. But this is not the case in many economies or energy sectors. Many policies distort the market in favour of existing fossil fuel technologies." The International Solar Energy Society has stated that "historical incentives for the conventional energy resources continue even today to bias markets by burying many of the real societal costs of their use".

Fossil-fuel energy systems have different production, transmission, and end-use costs and characteristics than do renewable energy systems, and new promotional policies are needed to ensure that renewable systems develop as quickly and broadly as is socially desirable. Lester Brown states that the market "does not incorporate the indirect costs of providing goods or services into prices, it does not value nature's services adequately, and it does not respect the sustainable-yield thresholds of natural systems". It also favors the near term over the long term, thereby showing limited concern for future generations. Tax and subsidy shifting can help overcome these problems, though is also problematic to combine different international normative regimes regulating this issue.

== Examples ==
=== China ===
Most energy in China comes from coal

Development of carbon dioxide emissions in China

The People's Republic of China is both the world's largest energy consumer and the largest industrial country. China is currently the world's largest emitter of greenhouse gases, and coal in China is a major cause of global warming. China is also the world's largest renewable energy producer, and the largest producer of hydroelectricity, solar power and wind power in the world. The energy policy of China is connected to its industrial policy, where the goals of China's industrial production dictate its energy demand management.

Being a country that depends heavily on foreign petroleum import for both domestic consumption and as raw materials for light industry manufacturing, electrification is a huge component of the Chinese national energy policy.

=== India ===
The energy policy of India is to increase the locally produced energy in India and reduce energy poverty, with more focus on developing alternative sources of energy, particularly nuclear, solar and wind energy. Net energy import dependency was 40.9% in 2021-22. The primary energy consumption in India grew by 13.3% in FY2022-23 and is the third biggest with 6% global share after China and USA. The total primary energy consumption from coal (452.2 Mtoe; 45.88%), crude oil (239.1 Mtoe; 29.55%), natural gas (49.9 Mtoe; 6.17%), nuclear energy (8.8 Mtoe; 1.09%), hydroelectricity (31.6 Mtoe; 3.91%) and renewable power (27.5 Mtoe; 3.40%) is 809.2 Mtoe (excluding traditional biomass use) in the calendar year 2018. In 2018, India's net imports are nearly 205.3 million tons of crude oil and its products, 26.3 Mtoe of LNG and 141.7 Mtoe coal totaling to 373.3 Mtoe of primary energy which is equal to 46.13% of total primary energy consumption. India is largely dependent on fossil fuel imports to meet its energy demands – by 2030, India's dependence on energy imports is expected to exceed 53% of the country's total energy consumption.

India's energy policy increasingly emphasizes energy transition and decarbonization strategies, particularly in sectors such as transportation. According to a report by The Energy and Resources Institute (TERI), the country is focusing on electric mobility, alternative fuels, and policy-driven approaches to reduce carbon emissions and improve long-term energy sustainability.

=== European Union ===
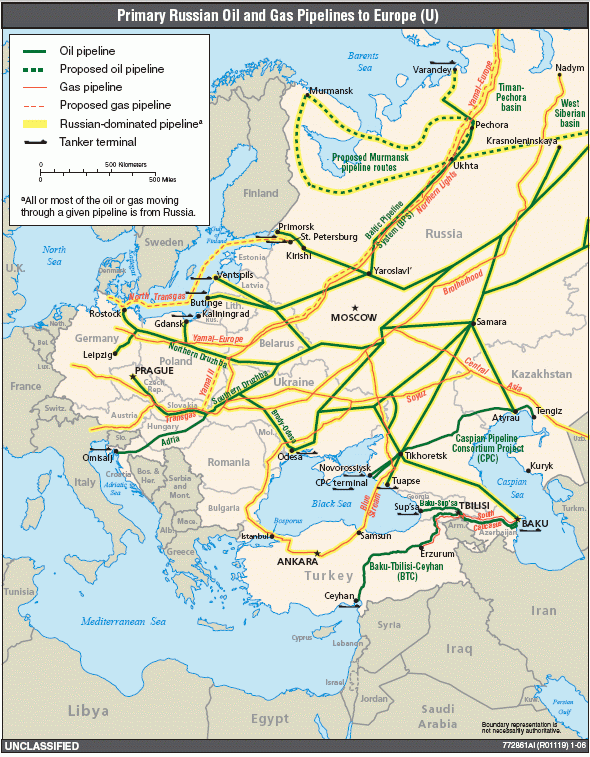
Russia was a key oil and gas supplier to Europe (map from 2013). This changed with the Russian invasion of Ukraine in 2022.

The energy policy of the European Union focuses on energy security, sustainability, and integrating the energy markets of member states. An increasingly important part of it is climate policy.
A key energy policy adopted in 2009 is the 20/20/20 objectives, binding for all EU Member States. The target involved increasing the share of renewable energy in its final energy use to 20%, reduce greenhouse gases by 20% and increase efficient energy use by 20%. After this target was met, new targets for 2030 were set at a 55% reduction of greenhouse gas emissions by 2030 as part of the European Green Deal. Since the Russian invasion of Ukraine has begun, the EU's energy policy turned more towards energy security in their REPowerEU policy package, which boosts both renewable deployment and fossil fuel infrastructure for alternative suppliers.

=== Russia ===
Russia's energy policy is presented in the government's Energy Strategy document, first approved in 2000, which sets out the government's policy to 2020 (later extended to 2030). The Energy Strategy outlines several key priorities: increased energy efficiency, reducing the impact on the environment, sustainable development, energy development and technological development, as well as improved effectiveness and competitiveness. Russia's greenhouse gas emissions are large because of its energy policy. Russia is rich in natural energy resources and is one of the world's energy superpowers. Russia is the world's leading net energy exporter, and was a major supplier to the European Union until the Russian invasion of Ukraine. Russia has signed and ratified the Kyoto Protocol and Paris Agreement. Numerous scholars posit that Russia uses its energy exports as a foreign policy instrument towards other countries.

=== United Kingdom ===
The energy policy of the United Kingdom refers to the United Kingdom's efforts towards reducing energy intensity, reducing energy poverty, and maintaining energy supply reliability. The United Kingdom has had success in this, though energy intensity remains high. There is an ambitious goal to reduce carbon dioxide emissions in future years, but it is unclear whether the programmes in place are sufficient to achieve this objective. Regarding energy self-sufficiency, UK policy does not address this issue, other than to concede historic energy security is currently ceasing to exist (due to the decline of North Sea oil production).

The United Kingdom historically has a good policy record of encouraging public transport links with cities, despite encountering problems with high speed trains, which have the potential to reduce dramatically domestic and short-haul European flights. The policy also encourages the uptake of electric vehicles, options which represent viable means to moderate rising transport fossil fuel consumption. Regarding renewable energy, the United Kingdom has goals for wind and tidal energy. The 2007 White Paper on Energy set a target that 20% of the UK's energy must come from renewable sources by 2020.

The current energy policy of the United Kingdom is the responsibility of the Department for Energy Security and Net Zero (DESNZ), after the Department for Business, Energy and Industrial Strategy was split into the Department for Business and Trade and the Department for Science, Innovation and Technology in 2023. Energy markets are regulated by the Office of Gas and Electricity Markets (Ofgem).

Areas of focus for energy policy by the UK government have changed since the Electricity Act 1989 and the Gas Act 1986 privatised these utilities. The policy focuses of successive UK governments since the full liberalisation of gas and electricity markets in 1998 and 1999 have included managing energy prices, decarbonisation, the rollout of smart meters, and improving the energy efficiency of the country's building stock.

=== United States ===
The energy policy of the United States is determined by federal, state, and local entities. Federal Energy policy is principally led by the U.S. Department of Energy. Energy policy intersects closely with decarbonization, climate policy, and environmental policy.

Energy policy spans issues of decarbonization, energy production, distribution, consumption, and modes of use, such as building codes, mileage standards, and commuting policies. U.S. energy policy may be addressed via legislation, regulation, court decisions, public participation, and other techniques.

Major federal energy policy acts were passed in 1974, 1992, 2005, 2007, 2008, 2009, 2020, 2021, and 2022, although energy-related policies have appeared in many other bills. The most significant recent bills include the Biden Administration Inflation Reduction Act as well as the Bipartisan Infrastructure Law.

== By country ==
Energy policies vary by country, see tables below.

== See also ==
- Energy balance
- Energy industry
- Energy security
- Energy supply
- Energy transition
- Environmental policy
- Petroleum politics
- Sustainable energy
