= Nuclear renaissance =

Possible nuclear power industry revival

A timeline of commissioned and decommissioned nuclear capacity, 1970 to 2016.

Since about 2001 the term nuclear renaissance has been used to refer to a possible nuclear power industry revival, driven by rising fossil fuel prices and new concerns about meeting greenhouse gas emission limits.

The term emerged in a context brought about by a worldwide slowdown in the rollout of new nuclear projects. The quantity of nuclear electricity generated worldwide had previously had a marked increase in the period from the late 1970s to the mid-1990s. This was brought about by massive nuclear programs in countries such as the US and France (see graph). With spiralling costs and a decline in the public acceptability of nuclear projects brought about in the aftermath of the Chernobyl nuclear accident in 1986, the speed of the rollout dwindled rapidly, leading to growing questions about the future of the industry.

In the 2000s, the principal vehicle of industry growth was thought to be the project then known as the European Pressurised Reactor (EPR), led jointly by the French and German governments. Initial implementation of the project was poor, with costly delays and overruns in France, Finland and China.

In 2011, the Fukushima nuclear accident renewed fears about nuclear safety worldwide. Several countries, including Germany, announced a complete withdrawal from nuclear electricity generation. By 2012, the World Nuclear Association reported that nuclear electricity generation was at its lowest level since 1999.

In the 2010s, industry growth was led by advances in China, as seen on the graph below. In 2015, for instance, 10 nuclear reactors were connected to the grid, the highest number recorded since 1990. Expanding Asian nuclear programs were balanced by retirements of aging plants and nuclear reactor phase-outs with 7 reactors permanently decommissioned in 2015. By that time, 67 new nuclear reactors were under construction, including four EPR units.

In the same period, the nuclear industry in Europe and the US was beset with industrial difficulties. In 2015, French nuclear giant Areva, the then-world leader in reactor construction, collapsed, forcing a government-sponsored takeover by utility provider EDF. The restructuring caused further delays in EPR rollout. In 2017, the American producer of the AP1000 reactor Westinghouse Electric Company filed for Chapter 11 bankruptcy protection. Together with delays and cost overruns, the bankruptcy caused cancellation of the two AP1000 reactors under construction at the Virgil C. Summer Nuclear Generating Station.

Despite these concerns, growing apprehension over the energy transition has led in recent years to a reappraisal of the role of nuclear energy as a reliable and carbon-free source of electricity. In particular, the 2022 global energy crisis brought renewed interest in nuclear energy due to low carbon emissions, less need for fuel import and a stable power supply compared to wind and solar. Countries began reversing or delaying nuclear phase-outs and greater attention being given to newer technologies such as Small Modular Reactors alongside increased incentives, such as the European Union listing nuclear energy as green energy.

== History ==
By the year 2009, annual generation of nuclear power had been on a slight downward trend since 2007, decreasing 1.8% in 2009 to 2558 TWh with nuclear power meeting 13–14% of the world's electricity demand. A major factor in the decrease has been the prolonged repair of seven large reactors at the Kashiwazaki-Kariwa Nuclear Power Plant in Japan following the Niigata-Chuetsu-Oki earthquake.

In the same year's World Energy Outlook, the International Energy Agency stated that:

A nuclear renaissance is possible but cannot occur overnight. Nuclear projects face significant hurdles, including extended construction periods and related risks, long licensing processes and manpower shortages, plus long‐standing issues related to waste disposal, proliferation and local opposition. The financing of new nuclear power plants, especially in liberalized markets, has always been difficult and the financial crisis seems almost certain to have made it even more so. The huge capital requirements, combined with risks of cost overruns and regulatory uncertainties, make investors and lenders very cautious, even when demand growth is robust.

In March 2011 the nuclear accident at Japan's Fukushima I Nuclear Power Plant and shutdowns at other nuclear facilities raised questions among some commentators over the future of nuclear power generation. Platts reported that "the crisis at Japan's Fukushima nuclear plants has prompted leading energy-consuming countries to review the safety of their existing reactors and cast doubt on the speed and scale of planned expansions around the world".

Following the accident, the government of Germany announced a phaseout of nuclear power in the near future. As a result, German constructor Siemens exited the sector, and supported the German government's planned energy transition to renewable energy technologies, leaving Areva as the sole actor in EPR construction. China, Switzerland, Israel, Malaysia, Thailand, the United Kingdom, Italy and the Philippines reviewed their nuclear power programs. Indonesia and Vietnam still planned to build nuclear power plants. Countries such as Australia, Austria, Denmark, Greece, Ireland, Latvia, Liechtenstein, Luxembourg, Portugal, Israel, Malaysia, New Zealand, and Norway remained opposed to nuclear power.

Following the accident, the International Energy Agency halved its estimate of additional nuclear generating capacity built by 2035.

The World Nuclear Association has reported that “nuclear power generation suffered its biggest ever one-year fall through 2012 as the bulk of the Japanese fleet remained offline for a full calendar year”. Data from the International Atomic Energy Agency showed that nuclear power plants globally produced 2346 TWh of electricity in 2012 – seven per cent less than in 2011. The figures illustrate the effects of a full year of 48 Japanese power reactors producing no power during the year. The permanent closure of eight reactor units in Germany was also a factor. Problems at Crystal River, Fort Calhoun and the two San Onofre units in the USA meant they produced no power for the full year, while in Belgium Doel 3 and Tihange 2 were out of action for six months. Compared to 2010, the nuclear industry produced 11% less electricity in 2012.

As of July 2013, "a total of 437 nuclear reactors were operating in 30 countries, seven fewer than the historical maximum of 444 in 2002. Since 2002, utilities have started up 28 units and disconnected 36 including six units at the Fukushima Daiichi nuclear power plant in Japan. The 2010 world reactor fleet had a total nominal capacity of about 370 gigawatts (or thousand megawatts). Despite seven fewer units operating in 2013 than in 2002, the capacity is still about 7 gigawatts higher". The numbers of new operative reactors, final shutdowns and new initiated constructions according to International Atomic Energy Agency (IAEA) in 2010 are as follows:

== Overview ==
A total of 72 reactors were under construction at the beginning of 2014, the highest number in 25 years. Several of the under construction reactors are carry over from earlier eras; some are partially completed reactors on which work has resumed (e.g., in Argentina); some are small and experimental (e.g., Russian floating reactors); and some have been on the IAEA's “under construction” list for years (e.g., in India and Russia). Reactor projects in Eastern Europe are essentially replacing old Soviet reactors shut down due to safety concerns. Most of the 2010 activity ― 30 reactors ― is taking place in four countries: China, India, Russia and South Korea. Turkey, the United Arab Emirates and Iran are the only countries that are currently building their first power reactors, Iran's construction began decades ago.

Eight German nuclear power reactors (Biblis A and B, Brunsbuettel, Isar 1, Kruemmel, Neckarwestheim 1, Philippsburg 1 and Unterweser) were permanently shutdown on August 6, 2011, following the Japanese Fukushima nuclear disaster.

Various barriers to a nuclear renaissance have been suggested. These include: unfavourable economics compared to other sources of energy, slowness in addressing climate change, industrial bottlenecks and personnel shortages in the nuclear sector, and the contentious issue of what to do with nuclear waste or spent nuclear fuel. There are also concerns about more nuclear accidents, security, and nuclear weapons proliferation.

New reactors under construction in Finland and France, which were meant to lead a nuclear renaissance, have been delayed and are running over-budget. China has 22 new reactors under construction, and there are also a considerable number of new reactors being built in South Korea, India, and Russia. At the same time, at least 100 older and smaller reactors will "most probably be closed over the next 10–15 years". So the expanding nuclear programs in Asia are balanced by retirements of aging plants and nuclear reactor phase-outs.

A study by UBS, reported on April 12, 2011, predicts that around 30 nuclear plants may be closed worldwide, with those located in seismic zones or close to national boundaries being the most likely to shut. The analysts believe that 'even pro-nuclear countries such as France will be forced to close at least two reactors to demonstrate political action and restore the public acceptability of nuclear power', noting that the events at Fukushima 'cast doubt on the idea that even an advanced economy can master nuclear safety'. In September 2011, German engineering giant Siemens announced it will withdraw entirely from the nuclear industry, as a response to the Fukushima nuclear disaster in Japan.

The 2011 World Energy Outlook report by the International Energy Agency stated that having "second thoughts on nuclear would have far-reaching consequences" and that a substantial shift away from nuclear power would boost demand for fossil fuels, putting additional upward pressure on the price of energy, raising additional concerns about energy security, and making it more difficult and expensive to combat climate change. The reports suggests that the consequences would be most severe for nations with limited local energy resources and which have been planning to rely heavily on nuclear power for future energy security, and that it would make it substantially more challenging for developing economies to satisfy their rapidly increasing demand for electricity.

John Rowe, chair of Exelon (the largest nuclear power producer in the US), has said that the nuclear renaissance is "dead". He says that solar, wind and cheap natural gas have significantly reduced the prospects of coal and nuclear power plants around the world. Amory Lovins says that the sharp and steady cost reductions in solar power has been a "stunning market success".

In 2013 the analysts at the investment research firm Morningstar, Inc. concluded that nuclear power was not a viable source of new power in the West. On nuclear renaissance they wrote:

The economies of scale experienced in France during its initial build-out and the related strength of supply chain and labor pool were imagined by the dreamers who have coined the term ‘nuclear renaissance’ for the rest of the world. But outside of China and possibly South Korea this concept seems a fantasy, as should become clearer examining even theoretical projections for new nuclear build today.

== Economics ==
Nuclear power plants are large construction projects with very high up-front costs. The cost of capital is also steep due to the risk of construction delays and obstructing legal action. The large capital cost of nuclear power has been a key barrier to the construction of new reactors around the world, and the economics worsened, due to the 2008 financial crisis. As the OECD's Nuclear Energy Agency points out, "investors tend to favor less capital intensive and more flexible technologies". This has led to a large increase in the use of natural gas for base-load power production, often using more sophisticated combined cycle plants.

== Accidents and safety ==
Newer reactor designs that are intended to provide increased safety have been developed over time. The next nuclear plants to be built will likely be Generation III or III+ designs, and a few are being built in Japan. However, safety risks may be the greatest when nuclear systems are the newest, and operators have less experience with them. Nuclear engineer David Lochbaum explained that almost all serious nuclear accidents occurred with what was at the time the most recent technology. He argues that "the problem with new reactors and accidents is twofold: scenarios arise that are impossible to plan for in simulations; and humans make mistakes".

== Controversy ==
A nuclear power controversy has surrounded the deployment and use of nuclear fission reactors to generate electricity from nuclear fuel for civilian purposes. The controversy peaked during the 1970s and 1980s, when it "reached an intensity unprecedented in the history of technology controversies", in some countries.

In 2008 there were reports of a revival of the anti-nuclear movement in Germany and protests in France during 2004 and 2007. Also in 2008 in the United States, there were protests about, and criticism of, several new nuclear reactor proposals and later some objections to license renewals for existing nuclear plants.

== Public opinion ==
Global public support for energy sources, based on a survey by Ipsos (2011) taken 2 months after the Fukushima Disaster.

In 2005, the International Atomic Energy Agency presented the results of a series of public opinion surveys in the Global Public Opinion on Nuclear Issues report. Majorities of respondents in 14 of the 18 countries surveyed believe that the risk of terrorist acts involving radioactive materials at nuclear facilities is high, because of insufficient protection. While majorities of citizens generally support the continued use of existing nuclear power reactors, most people do not favour the building of new nuclear plants, and 25% of respondents feel that all nuclear power plants should be closed down.

Stressing the climate change benefits of nuclear energy positively influences 10% of people to be more supportive of expanding the role of nuclear power in the world, but there is still a general reluctance to support the building of more nuclear power plants. In 2011, after the Fukushima Disaster, Civil Society Institute (CSI) found out that 58 percent of the respondents indicated less support of using nuclear power in the United States. Two-thirds of the respondents said they would protest the construction of a nuclear reactor within 50 miles of their homes.

A 2011 BBC poll indicated little support across the world for building new nuclear reactors. The global research agency GlobeScan, commissioned by BBC News, polled 23,231 people in 23 countries from July to September 2011, several months after the Fukushima nuclear disaster. In countries with existing nuclear programmes, people are significantly more opposed than they were in 2005, with only the UK and US bucking the trend. Most believe that boosting energy efficiency and renewable energy can meet their needs.

== By region and country ==
=== Africa ===
As of March 2010, ten African nations had begun exploring plans to build nuclear reactors.

==== Egypt ====
Egypt's first nuclear power plant, El Dabaa Nuclear Power Plant, a Russian built VVER. is under construction as of 2026. The facility will compromise four units, each with a generating capacity of 1,200 MWe, bringing the total installed capacity to 4,800 MWe.

==== Ghana ====
Ghana aims to commission 1,000 MWe of nuclear capacity by 2034. It has selected Nsuban as its preferred site and pursued partnerships with China Nuclear National Corporation (CNNC) for a large reactor and Regnum Technology Group for small modular reactors. However, funding shortages are delaying preparatory studies.

==== South Africa ====
South Africa (which has two nuclear power reactors), however, removed government funding for its planned new PBMRs in 2010.

==== Nigeria ====
In 2021 it was announced that the first nuclear power plant of Nigeria, an OPEN100-based pressurized water reactor (PWR) with 100 Megawatts electric power, would be built. The Open100 design is a small modular reactor with open source blueprints making use of decades of experience in PWR construction operation and maintenance across dozens of reactor types around the globe.

=== Americas ===
==== Argentina ====
Argentina is developing CAREM, an indigenous Small Modular Reactor (SMR) project led by the National Atomic Energy Commission (CNEA). The CAREM25 prototype has an electrical capacity of 25 MWe and features an integral pressurized water reactor design, incorporating passive safety systems and natural coolant circulation. Construction began in 2014, with initial reactor start-up originally scheduled for 2028.

Brazil

According to the International Atomic Energy Agency (IAEA), Brazil’s third nuclear reactor, Angra 3, remains under construction as of 2026.

==== Canada ====
With several CANDU reactors facing closure selected plants will be completely refurbished between 2016 and 2026, extending their operation beyond 2050.

==== United States ====
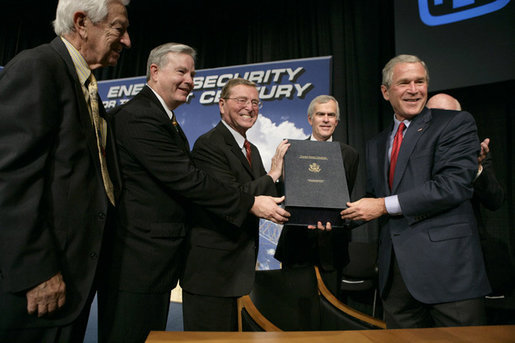
George W. Bush signing the Energy Policy Act of 2005, which was designed to promote US nuclear reactor construction, through incentives and subsidies, including cost-overrun support up to a total of $2 billion for six new nuclear plants.

Between 2007 and 2009, 13 companies applied to the Nuclear Regulatory Commission for construction and operating licenses to build 30 new nuclear power reactors in the United States. However, the case for widespread nuclear plant construction was eroded due to abundant natural gas supplies, slow electricity demand growth in a weak US economy, lack of financing, and uncertainty following the Fukushima nuclear disaster. Many license applications for proposed new reactors were suspended or cancelled.

Only a few new reactors will enter service by 2020. These will not be the cheapest energy options available, but they are an attractive investment for utilities because the government mandates that taxpayers pay for construction in advance. In 2013, four aging, uncompetitive, reactors were permanently closed: San Onofre 2 and 3 in California, Crystal River 3 in Florida, and Kewaunee in Wisconsin. Vermont Yankee, in Vernon, is scheduled to close in 2014, following many protests. New York State is seeking to close Indian Point Energy Center, in Buchanan, 30 miles from New York City.

Neither climate change abatement, nor the Obama Administration's endorsement of nuclear power with $18.5 billion in loan guarantees, have been able to propel nuclear power in the US past existing obstacles. The Fukushima nuclear disaster has not helped either.

As of 2014, the U.S. nuclear industry began a new lobbying effort, hiring three former senators — Evan Bayh, a Democrat; Judd Gregg, a Republican; and Spencer Abraham, a Republican — as well as William M. Daley, a former staffer to President Obama. The initiative is called Nuclear Matters, and it has begun a newspaper advertising campaign.

Locations of new US reactors and their scheduled operating dates are:

- Tennessee, Watts Bar unit 2 is in operation since October 2016;
- Georgia, Vogtle Electric unit 3 became operational in 2023, unit 4 is now planned to be operational in 2024.

In March 2017, parent company Toshiba placed Westinghouse Electric Company in Chapter 11 bankruptcy because of US$9 billion of losses from its nuclear reactor construction projects. The projects responsible for this loss are mostly the construction of four AP1000 reactors at Vogtle in Georgia and V. C. Summer in South Carolina. The U.S. government had given $8.3 billion of loan guarantees on the financing of the four nuclear reactors being built in the U.S. The plans at V. C. Summer have been cancelled. Peter A. Bradford, former U.S. Nuclear Regulatory Commission member, commented "They placed a big bet on this hallucination of a nuclear renaissance".

=== Asia ===
As of 2008, the greatest growth in nuclear generation was expected to be in China, Japan, South Korea and India.

==== China ====
As of early 2013 China had 17 nuclear reactors operating and 32 under construction, with more planned. "China is rapidly becoming self-sufficient in reactor design and construction, as well as other aspects of the fuel cycle." However, according to a government research unit, China must not build "too many nuclear power reactors too quickly", in order to avoid a shortfall of fuel, equipment and qualified plant workers.

==== India ====
Despite some opposition after the Fukushima Incident India continues to expand its nuclear power generation with installed nuclear power capacity increasing from 4780MW in 2014 to 6780MW by 2021 and is expected to reach 22480 MW by 2031.

In 2022 India introduced the long-term low-emission development strategy (LT-LEDS) at the COP27 Climate Conference in which in addition to the tripling of nuclear capacity by 2032 India pledged to increase the role of Nuclear power and is currently exploring the use of Small Modular Reactors as well as the use of nuclear power for desalination and hydrogen fuel production.

==== South Korea ====
South Korea is exploring nuclear projects with a number of nations.

=== Australia ===
Australia is a major producer of uranium, which it exports as uranium oxide to nuclear power generating nations. Australia has a single research reactor at Lucas Heights, but does not generate electricity via nuclear power. As of 2015, the majority of the nation's uranium mines are in South Australia, where a Nuclear Fuel Cycle Royal Commission is investigating the opportunities and costs of expanding the state's role in the nuclear fuel cycle. As of January 2016, new nuclear industrial development (other than the mining of uranium) is prohibited by various acts of federal and state legislation. The Federal government will consider the findings of the South Australian Royal Commission after it releases its findings in 2016.

=== Europe ===
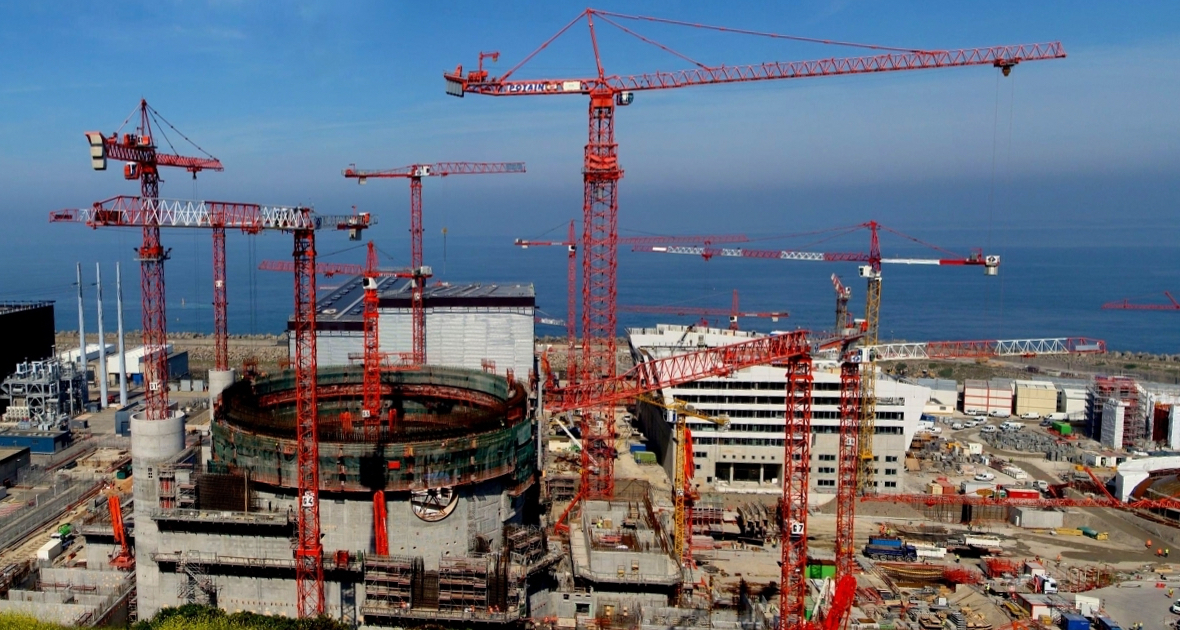
EPR Flamanville 3 project (seen here in 2010) originally expected to be operational in 2012, has been repeatedly delayed to at least 2024 due to "both structural and economic reasons," and the project's total cost has ballooned well above the original estimates. Similarly, the cost of the identical EPR being built at Olkiluoto, Finland has escalated dramatically, and the project is also well behind schedule. The initial low cost forecasts for these megaprojects exhibited "optimism bias".

In October 2010, the British government announced eight locations it considered suitable for future nuclear power stations. This has resulted in public opposition and protests at some of the sites. In March 2012, two of the big six power companies announced they would be pulling out of developing new nuclear power plants. The decision by RWE npower and E.ON follows uncertainty over nuclear energy following the Fukushima nuclear disaster last year. The companies will not proceed with their Horizon project, which was to develop nuclear reactors at Wylfa in North Wales and at Oldbury-on-Severn in Gloucestershire. Their decision follows a similar announcement by Scottish and Southern Electricity last year. Analysts said the decision meant the future of UK nuclear power could now be in doubt.

The 2011 Japanese Fukushima nuclear disaster has led some European energy officials to "think twice about nuclear expansion". Switzerland has abandoned plans to replace its old nuclear reactors and will take the last one offline in 2034. Anti-nuclear opposition intensified in Germany. In the following months the government decided to shut down eight reactors immediately (August 6, 2011) and to have the other nine off the grid by the end of 2022. Renewable energy in Germany is believed to be able to compensate for much of the loss.

In September 2011, Siemens, which had been responsible (through its subsidiary Kraftwerk Union) for constructing all 17 of Germany's existing nuclear power plants, announced that it would exit the nuclear sector following the Fukushima disaster and the subsequent changes to German energy policy. Chief executive Peter Loescher has supported the German government's planned energy transition to renewable energy technologies, calling it a "project of the century" and saying Berlin's target of reaching 35% renewable energy sources by 2020 was feasible.

In October 2013, EDF Energy announced that an agreement had been reached regarding new nuclear plants to be built on the site of Hinkley Point C. EDF Group and the UK Government agreed on the key commercial terms of the investment contract. The final investment decision is still conditional on completion of the remaining key steps, including the agreement of the EU Commission.

In February 2014, Amory Lovins commented that:

Britain's plan for a fleet of new nuclear power stations is … unbelievable ... It is economically daft. The guaranteed price [being offered to French state company EDF] is over seven times the unsubsidised price of new wind in the US, four or five times the unsubsidised price of new solar power in the US. Nuclear prices only go up. Renewable energy prices come down. There is absolutely no business case for nuclear. The British policy has nothing to do with economic or any other rational base for decision making.

==== Belgium ====
In light of the 2022 Russian invasion of Ukraine the government of Belgium announced its intention to delay the nuclear phaseout originally planned for 2025. The two remaining nuclear power plants - Tihange 3 and Doel 4 - are to continue providing power to reduce dependency on fossil fuels.

==== Bulgaria ====
In 2022 the government of Bulgaria announced a deal to build a new nuclear power plant with Greece acting as the guaranteed customer of much of the electricity.

==== Czech Republic ====
In March 2022 the Czech government launched a tender for a new reactor in the 1-1.6 Gigawatt range at the existing Dukovany Nuclear Power Plant site. The EPR, the AP1000 and the APR-1400 are the finalists for the contract estimated to cost some €6 billion

==== Finland ====
After numerous delays and cost overruns the first EPR type reactor to start construction (but not the first to be finished) was connected to the grid in March 2022. The reactor with a net capacity of 1600 Megawatts cost €8.5 billion to build but was sold by Areva/Framatome to Teollisuuden Voima (TVO) at a fixed price of €3.5 billion.

==== France ====
During the 2022 French presidential election campaign French President Emmanuel Macron announced a program of new nuclear power plants in addition to the under construction Flamanville 3 reactor. The new power plants are planned to supplement and/or replace aging reactors built in the 1980s during the "plan Messmer" and to allow for a fossil fuel phaseout.

==== Netherlands ====
In late 2021 the government of Prime Minister Mark Rutte announced plans to extend the life of the sole existing nuclear power plant at Borssele but to build two new nuclear power plants in the coming years in order to maintain energy supply during and after the planned 2030 coal phaseout.

==== Poland ====
As of 2020, Poland was having plans to create 1.5 GW of nuclear capacities and eventually reach 9 GW by 2040. In 2022, Poland announced the construction of three AP1000 reactors from the American supplier Westinghouse until 2033 at Choczewo, near the Baltic Sea. In 2025, the European Commission approved economic support for the project. Construction is scheduled to begin in 2028, with the first reactor expected to start supplying electricity in 2036.

==== Russia ====
In April 2010 Russia announced new plans to start building 10 new nuclear reactors in the next year.

Russia is (as of 2022) the only country to have commercial scale fast breeder reactors. However, the blueprints of these reactors (BN-600 & BN-800) were hacked and leaked by Ukrainian aligned forces in 2022.

==== United Kingdom ====
In addition to the EPR under construction at Hinkley Point the government of Boris Johnson announced "big new bets" on nuclear power in light of the 2022 Russian invasion of Ukraine. In addition the existing Sizewell B plant is to be given a lifetime extension.

Currently UK plans to increase its nuclear capacity from 8GW in 2020 to around 24GW by 2050.

=== Middle East ===
==== United Arab Emirates ====
In December 2009 South Korea won a contract for four nuclear power plants to be built in the United Arab Emirates, for operation in 2017 to 2020.

The first commercial nuclear reactor in the country was connected to the grid in 2020 at Barakah nuclear power plant. Unit 2 started operating in 2021 and as of 2021 Unit 3 was expected to become operational in 2022.

==== Israel ====
As of November 2015, the Ministry of National Infrastructure, Energy and Water Resources is considering nuclear power in order to reduce greenhouse gas emissions 25% by 2030.

== Views and opinions ==
In June 2009, Mark Cooper from the Vermont Law School said: "The highly touted renaissance of nuclear power is based on fiction, not fact... There are numerous options available to meet the need for electricity in a carbon-constrained environment that are superior to building nuclear reactors".

In September 2009, Luc Oursel, chief executive of Areva Nuclear Plants (the core nuclear reactor manufacturing division of Areva) stated: "We are convinced about the nuclear renaissance". Areva has been hiring up to 1,000 people a month, "to prepare for a surge in orders from around the world". However, in June 2010, Standard & Poor's downgraded Areva's debt rating to BBB+ due to weakened profitability.

In 2010, Trevor Findlay from the Centre for International Governance Innovation stated that "despite some powerful drivers and clear advantages, a revival of nuclear energy faces too many barriers compared to other means of generating electricity for it to capture a growing market share to 2030".

In January 2010, the International Solar Energy Society stated that "... it appears that the pace of nuclear plant retirements will exceed the development of the few new plants now being contemplated, so that nuclear power may soon start on a downward trend. It will remain to be seen if it has any place in an affordable future world energy policy".

In March 2010, Steve Kidd from the World Nuclear Association said: "Proof of whether the mooted nuclear renaissance is merely 'industry hype' as some commentators suggest or reality will come over the next decade". In 2013 Kidd characterised the situation as a nuclear slowdown, requiring the industry to focus on better economics and improving public acceptance.

In August 2010, physicist Michael Dittmar stated that: "Nuclear fission's contribution to total electric energy has decreased from about 18 per cent a decade ago to about 14 per cent in 2008. On a worldwide scale, nuclear energy is thus only a small component of the global energy mix and its share, contrary to widespread belief, is not on the rise".

In March 2011, Alexander Glaser said: "It will take time to grasp the full impact of the unimaginable human tragedy unfolding after the earthquake and tsunami in Japan, but it is already clear that the proposition of a global nuclear renaissance ended on that day".

In 2011, Benjamin K. Sovacool said: "The nuclear waste issue, although often ignored in industry press releases and sponsored reports, is the proverbial elephant in the room stopping a nuclear renaissance".

== See also ==
- Anti-nuclear protests
- Generation III reactor
- Generation IV reactor
- List of nuclear power plants
- Lists of nuclear disasters and radioactive incidents
- Megaprojects and Risk
- Megatons to Megawatts Program
- Next Generation Nuclear Plant
- Nuclear accidents in the United States
- Nuclear energy policy
- Nuclear power phase-out
- Nuclear power by country
- One Less Nuclear Power Plant
- Pro-nuclear movement
- Sayonara Nuclear Power Plants
