= Nuclear power phase-out =

Discontinuation of usage of nuclear power for energy production

Timeline of commissioned and decommissioned nuclear capacity since the 1950s

Global status of nuclear deployment as of 2017 (source: see file description) Operating reactors, considering phase-out Civil nuclear power is illegal.

A nuclear power phase-out is the discontinuation of usage of nuclear power for energy production. Often initiated because of concerns about nuclear power, phase-outs usually include shutting down nuclear power plants and looking towards fossil fuels and renewable energy. Three nuclear accidents have influenced the discontinuation of nuclear power: the 1979 Three Mile Island partial nuclear meltdown in the United States, the 1986 Chernobyl disaster in the USSR (now Ukraine), and the 2011 Fukushima nuclear accident in Japan.

As of 2026, only two countries have permanently closed all of their formerly-functioning nuclear plants and have no active plans to restart or replace them: Lithuania in 2009 and Germany by 2023. As of 2026, a nuclear power phase-out is underway in Spain.

Italy and Kazakhstan both completed nuclear power phase-outs, but have subsequently announced plans to build new nuclear power plants. Armenia shut down its only nuclear plant but subsequently restarted it. Taiwan shut down all of its nuclear plants, but subsequently announced plans to restart several of them. Austria never used its first nuclear plant that was completely built. Cuba, Libya, North Korea and Poland never completed the construction of their first nuclear plants due to financial, political and technical reasons.

Nuclear shut-downs after Fukushima have significantly set back emissions reductions goals in several countries. A 2019 study of the impacts of the German and Japanese closures concludes that by continuing to operate their nuclear plants "these two countries could have prevented 28,000 air pollution-induced deaths and 2400 Mt CO_{2} emissions between 2011 and 2017. By sharply reducing nuclear instead of coal and gas after Fukushima, both countries lost the chance to prevent very large amounts of air pollution-induced deaths and CO_{2} emissions".

Several countries formerly opposed to opening nuclear programs or planning phaseouts have reversed course in recent years due to climate concerns and energy independence including Belgium, the Philippines, Greece, Sweden and South Korea.

== Overview ==
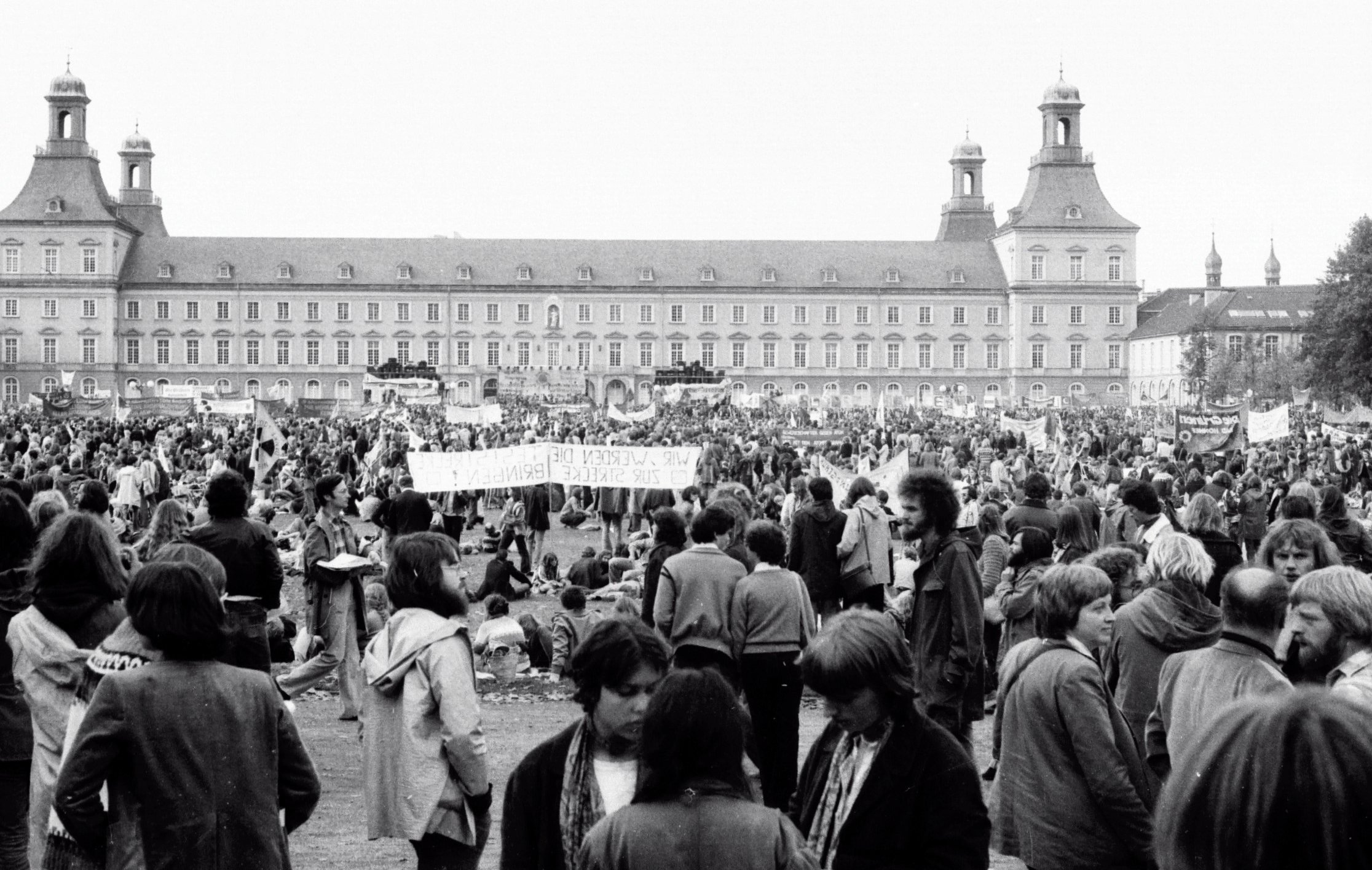
120,000 people attended an anti-nuclear protest in Bonn, West Germany, on 14 October 1979, following the Three Mile Island accident.

A popular movement against nuclear power exists in the Western world, based on concerns about more nuclear accidents and concerns about nuclear waste. Anti-nuclear critics see nuclear power as a dangerous, expensive way to boil water to generate electricity. The 1979 Three Mile Island accident and the 1986 Chernobyl disaster played a key role in stopping new plant construction in many countries. Major anti-nuclear power groups include Friends of the Earth, Greenpeace, Institute for Energy and Environmental Research, Nuclear Information and Resource Service, and Sortir du nucléaire (France).

Several countries, especially European countries, have abandoned the construction of new nuclear power plants. Austria (1978), Sweden (1980) and Italy (1987) voted in referendums to oppose or phase out nuclear power, while opposition in Ireland prevented a nuclear program there. Countries that have no nuclear plants and have restricted new plant constructions comprise Australia, Austria, Denmark, Greece, Italy, Ireland, Norway and Serbia. Poland stopped the construction of a plant. Belgium, Germany, Spain, and Sweden decided not to build new plants or intend to phase out nuclear power, although still mostly relying on nuclear energy.

New reactors under construction in Finland and France, which were meant to lead a nuclear new build, have been substantially delayed and are running over-budget. Despite these delays the Olkiluoto reactor is now online and delivering low-emissions power to the grid as of 12 March 2022. "When Olkiluoto 3 reaches full output, around 90% of Finland's electricity generation will come from clean, low-carbon electricity sources, with nuclear generation supplying around half of that." In addition, China has 11 units under construction and there are also new reactors being built in Bangladesh, Belarus, Brazil, India, Japan, Pakistan, Russia, Slovakia, South Korea, Turkey, United Arab Emirates, United Kingdom and the United States of America. At least 100 older and smaller reactors will "most probably be closed over the next 10–15 years".

Countries that wish to shut down nuclear power plants must find alternatives for electricity generation; otherwise, they are forced to become dependent on imports. Therefore, the discussion of a future for nuclear energy is intertwined with discussions about fossil fuels or an energy transition to renewable energy.

== Countries that have decided on a phase-out ==
The following countries either have a formal nuclear power phase-out underway, or have completed a phase-out, and there are, as of 2026, no known plans to reverse that policy or recommence nuclear power generation:

=== Germany ===
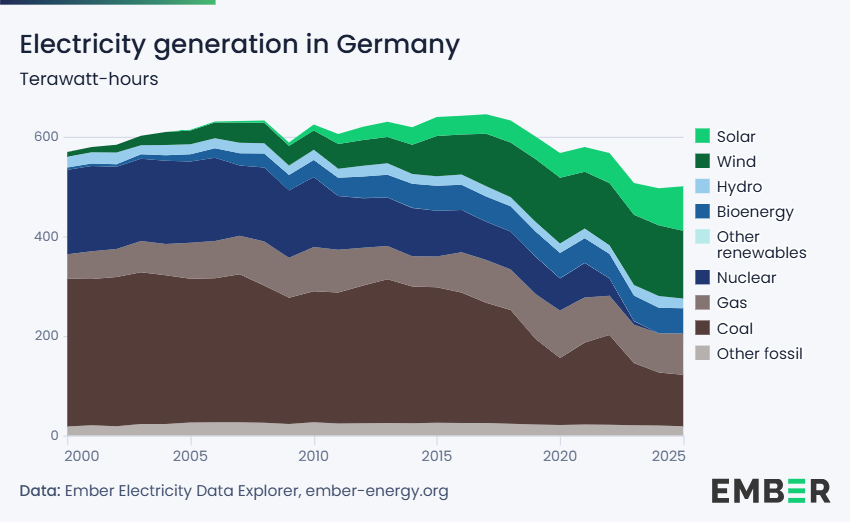
Electricity generation in Germany by source in Twh

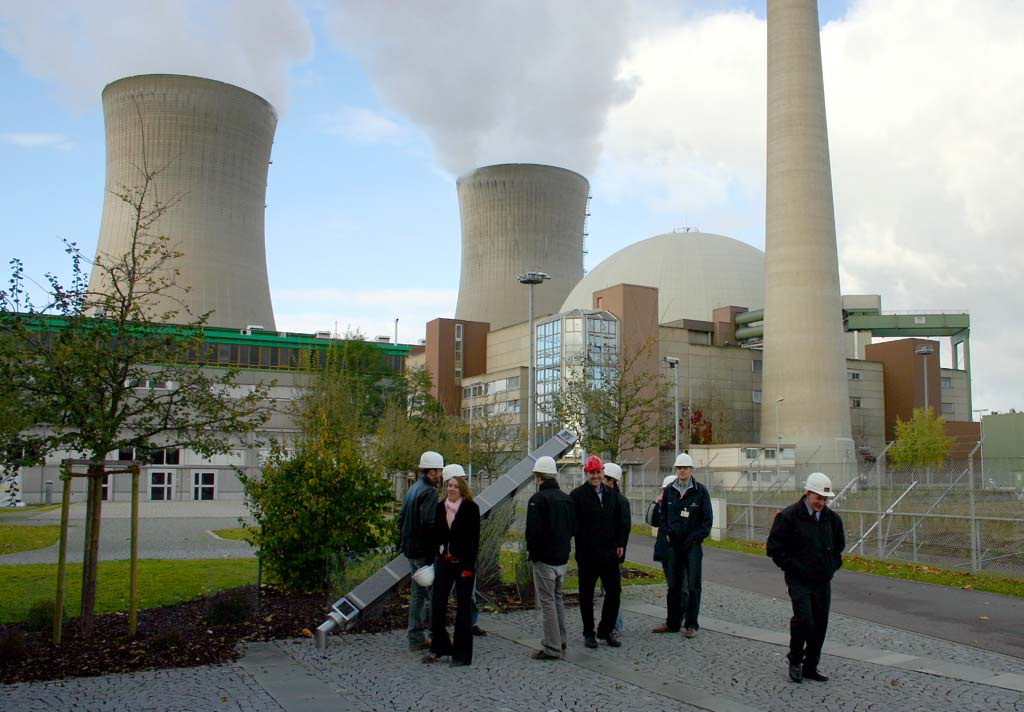
Nuclear power plant at Grafenrheinfeld, Germany. Chancellor Angela Merkel's coalition announced on 30 May 2011, that Germany's 17 nuclear power stations would be shut down by 2022, in a policy reversal following Japan's Fukushima nuclear accident.

Status: Phase-out complete

In 2000, the First Schröder cabinet, consisting of the SPD and Alliance '90/The Greens, officially announced its intention to phase out the use of nuclear energy. The power plants in Stade and Obrigheim were turned off on 14 November 2003, and 11 May 2005, respectively. The plants' dismantling was scheduled to begin in 2007.

The Renewable Energy Sources Act, passed in 2000, provided for a feed-in tariff in support of renewable energy. The German government, declaring climate protection as a key policy issue, announced a carbon dioxide reduction target by the year 2005 compared to 1990 of 25%. In 1998, the use of renewables in Germany reached 284 PJ of primary energy demand, which corresponded to 5% of the total electricity demand. By 2010, the German government wanted to reach 10%; in fact, 17% were reached (2011: 20%, 2015: 30%).

Anti-nuclear activists argued the German government had been supportive of nuclear power by providing financial guarantees for energy providers. Also, there were, as yet, no plans for the final storage of nuclear waste. By tightening safety regulations and increasing taxation, a faster end to nuclear power could have been forced. A gradual closing of nuclear power plants had come along with concessions in questions of safety for the population with transport of nuclear waste throughout Germany. This latter point was disagreed with by the Minister of Environment, Nature Conservation and Nuclear Safety.

In 2005, critics of a phase-out in Germany argued that the grid energy contribution from the nuclear power stations may not be adequately compensated in the short term, possibly causing an energy crisis. They also predicted that only coal-powered plants could compensate for nuclear power in general, and that CO_{2} emissions would increase tremendously as a result. A possible mitigating factor would be energy imported from France's lower carbon, (and primarily nuclear), power facilities. Russian natural gas would be an additional, perhaps necessary option. Numerous factors, including progress in wind turbine technology and photovoltaics, reduced the need for conventional alternatives.

In 2011, Deutsche Bank analysts concluded that "the global impact of the Fukushima disaster is a fundamental shift in public perception with regard to how a nation prioritizes and values its population's health, safety, security, and natural environment when determining its current and future energy pathways". There were many anti-nuclear protests and, on 29 May 2011, Angela Merkel's government announced that it would close all of Germany's nuclear power plants by December 2022.

Galvanised by the first anniversary of the Fukushima nuclear accident, anti-nuclear demonstrations were held in Germany in March 2012. Organisers said more than 50,000 people in six regions took part.

The German Energiewende designates a significant change in energy policy from 2010. The term encompasses a transition by Germany to a low carbon, environmentally sound, reliable, and affordable energy supply.

On 6 June 2011, following the Fukushima accident, the government removed the use of nuclear power as a bridging technology as part of their policy.

In September 2011, German engineering giant Siemens announced it would withdraw entirely from the nuclear industry, as a response to the Fukushima nuclear accident in Japan, and said that it would no longer build nuclear power plants anywhere in the world. The company's chairman, Peter Löscher, said that "Siemens was ending plans to cooperate with Rosatom, the Russian state-controlled nuclear power company, in the construction of dozens of nuclear plants throughout Russia over the coming two decades". Also in September 2011, IAEA Director General Yukiya Amano said the Japanese nuclear disaster "caused deep public anxiety throughout the world and damaged confidence in nuclear power".

A 2016 study shows that during the nuclear phaseout, the security of electricity supply in Germany stayed at the same high level compared to other European countries and even improved in 2014. The study was conducted near the halfway point of the phaseout, 9 plants having been shut and a further 8 still in operation.

In early October 2016, Swedish electric power company Vattenfall began litigation against the German government for its 2011 decision to accelerate the phase-out of nuclear power. Hearings took place at the World Bank's International Centre for Settlement of Investment Disputes (ICSID) in Washington, DC and Vattenfall claimed almost €4.7 billion in damages. The German government has called the action "inadmissible and unfounded". These proceedings were ongoing in December 2016, despite Vattenfall commencing civil litigation within Germany.

On 5 December 2016, the Federal Constitutional Court (Bundesverfassungsgericht) ruled that the nuclear plant operators affected by the accelerated phase-out of nuclear power following the Fukushima accident were eligible for "adequate" compensation. The court found that the nuclear exit was essentially constitutional but that the utilities were entitled to damages for the "good faith" investments they made in 2010. The utility companies were authorised to sue the German government under civil law. E.ON, RWE, and Vattenfall were expected to seek a total of €19 billion under separate suits. Six cases were registered with courts in Germany, as of 7 December 2016.

A scientific paper released in 2019 found that the German nuclear shutdown led to an increase in carbon dioxide emissions around 36.2 megatons per year, and killed 1100 people a year through increased air pollution. As they shut down nuclear power, Germany made heavy investments in renewable energy, but those same investments could have "cut much deeper into fossil fuel energy" if the nuclear generation had still been online.

Aligning with the end of the 2021 COP26 climate talks, the operators of Germany's six remaining nuclear power stations, utilities E.ON, RWE, and EnBW, rejected calls to keep the plants in operation beyond their scheduled shutdowns at the end of 2022. However, in reaction to the 2022 Russian invasion of Ukraine the debate about whether to extend the life of the three remaining reactors or whether to restart operation in the three reactors shut down at the end of 2021 (whose dismantling hadn't yet started) once more came to the forefront and operators said that it would be possible to extend the life of those reactors under certain conditions.

In July 2022, faced with a looming energy crisis, the German parliament voted to reactivate closed coal power plants.

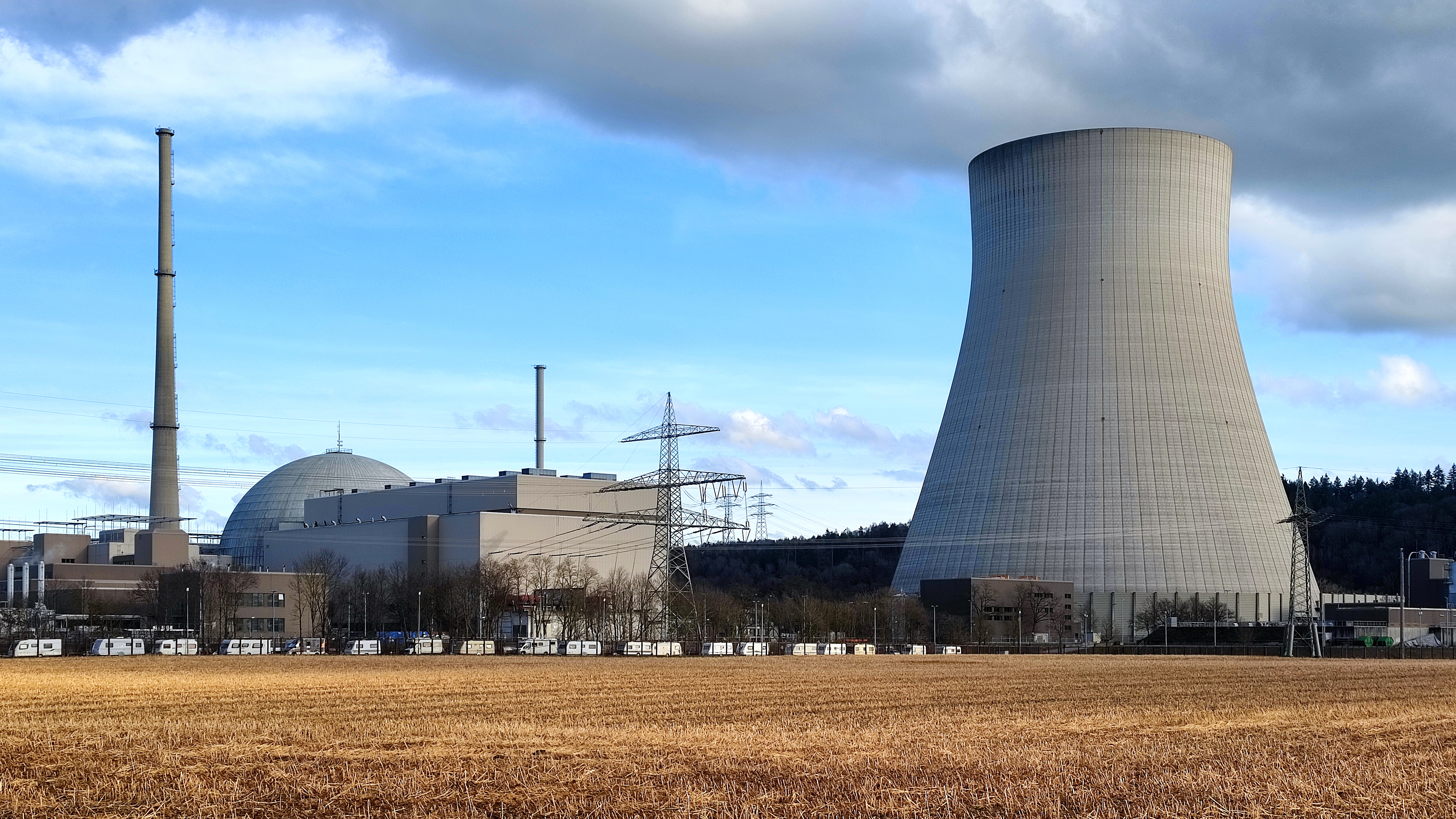
The Isar Nuclear Power Plant was taken out of service on 15 April 2023

In 2022, of the 17 nuclear power plants Germany had at its peak, three remained in operation: Isar 2, Emsland and Neckarwestheim 2, which were operated by German energy firms E.ON (EONGn.DE), RWE (RWEG.DE) and EnBW (EBKG.DE), respectively. According to federal legislation, these operators lost the right to operate their plants on 31 December 2022, the effective end-date for the stations. Germany's network regulator (part of the Economy Ministry), had the ability to decide that they were critical to the security of power supply (both electricity and nuclear transmutation) and allow them to run for longer.

The last three nuclear power plants in Germany—Emsland, Isar II and Neckarwestheim II—were shut down on 15 April 2023.

In April 2024, a controversy emerged relating to the decommissioning of Germany's nuclear power plants. German magazine Cicero claimed that German Economy Minister Robert Habeck had misled the public in 2022 and ignored the advice of experts who said nuclear facilities were still safe to operate.

In an opinion poll taken in Germany in March 2025, 55% of those polled were in favour of the country restarting its closed nuclear power plants, with 36% against such a proposal, and 9% unsure. However, only 32% were in favour of the construction of new reactors.

=== Lithuania ===
Status: Phase-out complete

As a precondition of its admission to the European Union, Lithuania agreed to decommission the Ignalina Nuclear Power Plant, its only nuclear power plant; the reasoning given was that the plant's reactors were of the same design of those at the Chernobyl Nuclear Power Plant, site of the Chernobyl disaster. The plant was duly shut down on 31 December 2009.

=== Spain ===
Status: Phase-out in progress, considering postponement

In Spain a moratorium was enacted by the socialist government in 1983 and in 2006 plans for a phase-out of seven reactors were being discussed anew.

In December 2023, the government of Spain confirmed a policy of phasing out nuclear power generation in the country, with the first reactor to shut down in 2027, and the last in 2035. However, in April 2025, the government subsequently indicated it would consider proposals from operators of its nuclear power plants to extend the closure dates of their plants, if any such proposals were submitted.

== Countries that have abandoned phase-outs ==
The following countries either reversed a previously-announced nuclear power phase-out policy before completion, or completed a phase-out but have, as of 2026, confirmed plans to restart closed reactors or construct new ones:

=== Phase-outs abandoned before completion ===
==== Belgium ====
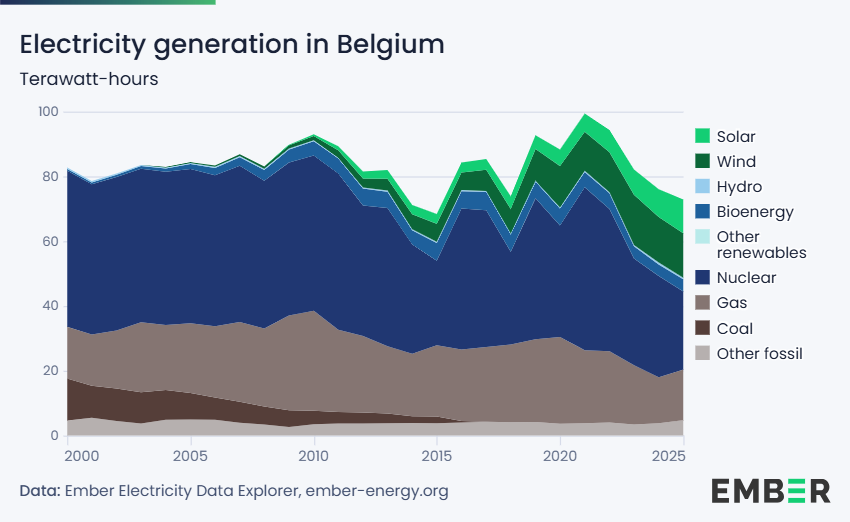
Electricity generation in Belgium in terawatt-hours

Belgium's nuclear phase-out legislation was agreed in July 1999 by the Liberals (VLD and MR), the Socialists (SP.A and PS) and the Greens party (Groen! and Ecolo). The phase-out law called for each of Belgium's seven reactors to close after 40 years of operation with no new reactors built subsequently. When the law was being passed, it was speculated it would be overturned again as soon as an administration without the Greens was in power.

In the federal election in May 2003, there was an electoral threshold of 5% for the first time. Therefore, the Green parties, the ECOLO, got only 3.06% of the votes, so ECOLO obtained no seat in the Chamber of Representatives. In July 2003, Guy Verhofstadt formed his second government. It was a continuation of the Verhofstadt I Government but without the Green parties. In September 2005, the government partially overturned the previous decision, extending the phase-out period for another 20 years, with possible further extensions.

In July 2005, the Federal Planning Bureau published a new report, which stated that oil and other fossil fuels generated 90% of Belgian energy use, while nuclear power accounted for 9% and renewable energy for 1%. Electricity amounted to 16% of total energy use, and while nuclear-powered electricity amounted to 9% of use in Belgium, in many parts of Belgium, especially in Flanders, it made up more than 50% of the electricity provided to households and businesses. This was one of the major reasons to extend the earlier phase-out, since it was difficult to provide more than 50% of the electricity by 'alternative' energy-production, and a revert to the classical coal-driven electricity would mean inability to adhere to the Kyoto Protocol.

In August 2005, French company Suez S.A. offered to buy the Belgian Electrabel, which owns both of Belgium's operating nuclear power stations. At the end of 2005, Suez had some 98.5% of all Electrabel shares. Beginning in 2006, Suez announced a merger with Gaz de France.

After the federal election in June 2007, a political crisis began and lasted until the end of 2011.

In the 2010–2011 Belgian government formation negotiations, the phase-out was emphasised again, with concrete plans to shut off three of the country's seven reactors by 2015.

Before the Fukushima nuclear disaster, the plan of the government was for all nuclear power stations to shut down by 2025. Although intermediate deadlines have been missed or pushed back, on 30 March 2018 the Belgian Council of Ministers confirmed the 2025 phase-out date and stated draft legislation would be brought forward later in the year.

In March 2022, the government decided to allow Doel 4 and Tihange 3 to continue operating until 2035 to allow the country to "strengthen its independence of fossil fuels in turbulent geopolitical times". Belgium's two newest nuclear plants are operated by French utility Engie and account for almost half of the country's electricity production.

Following approval by the Belgian Federal Parliament, an act was promulgated on 17 May 2025 repealing the 2003 phase-out law and reversing the country's nuclear power phase-out.

Belgium also continues to be active in nuclear research and is building MYRRHA, the world's first large scale demonstration of an accelerator-driven subcritical reactor that is to be used for nuclear transmutation of high level radioactive waste.

==== Japan ====
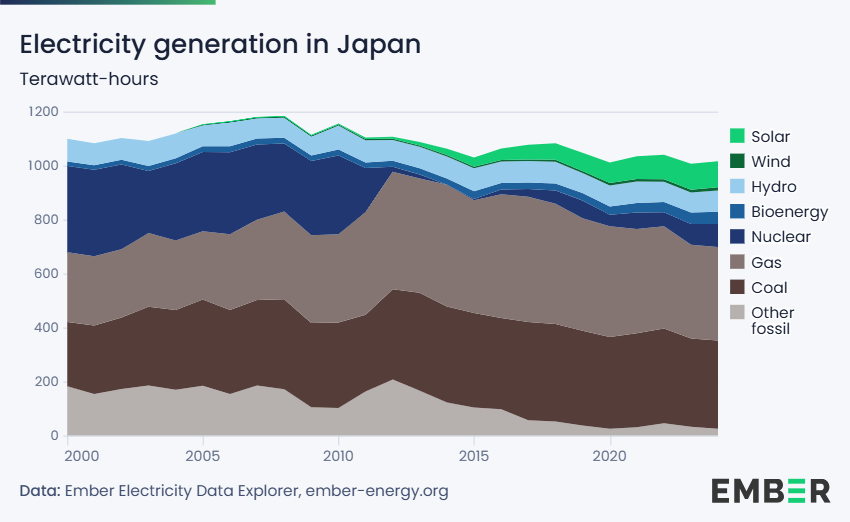
Electricity generation in Japan in terawatt-hours

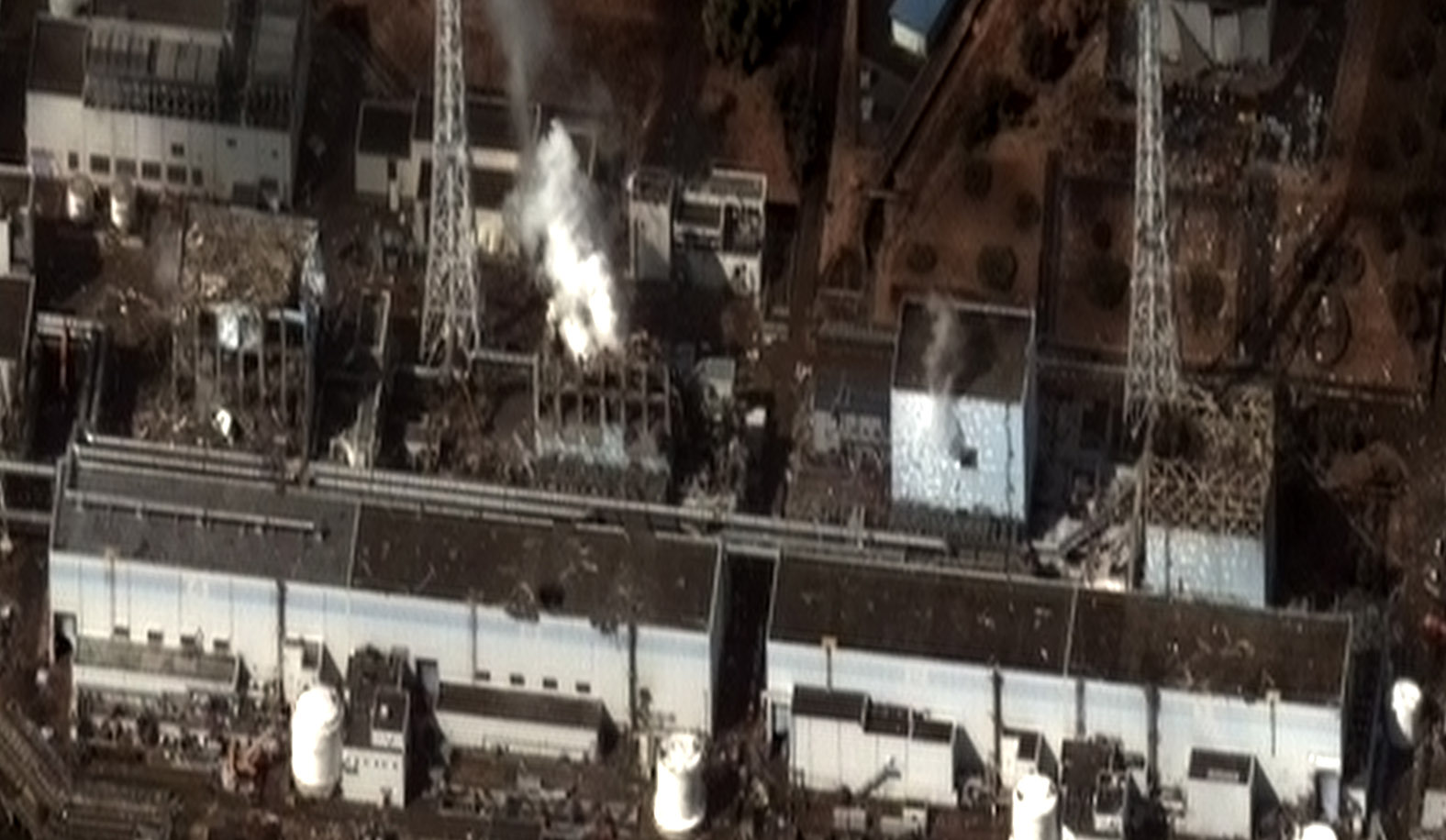
Three of the reactors at Fukushima I overheated, causing meltdowns that eventually led to hydrogen explosions, which released large amounts of radioactive gases into the air.

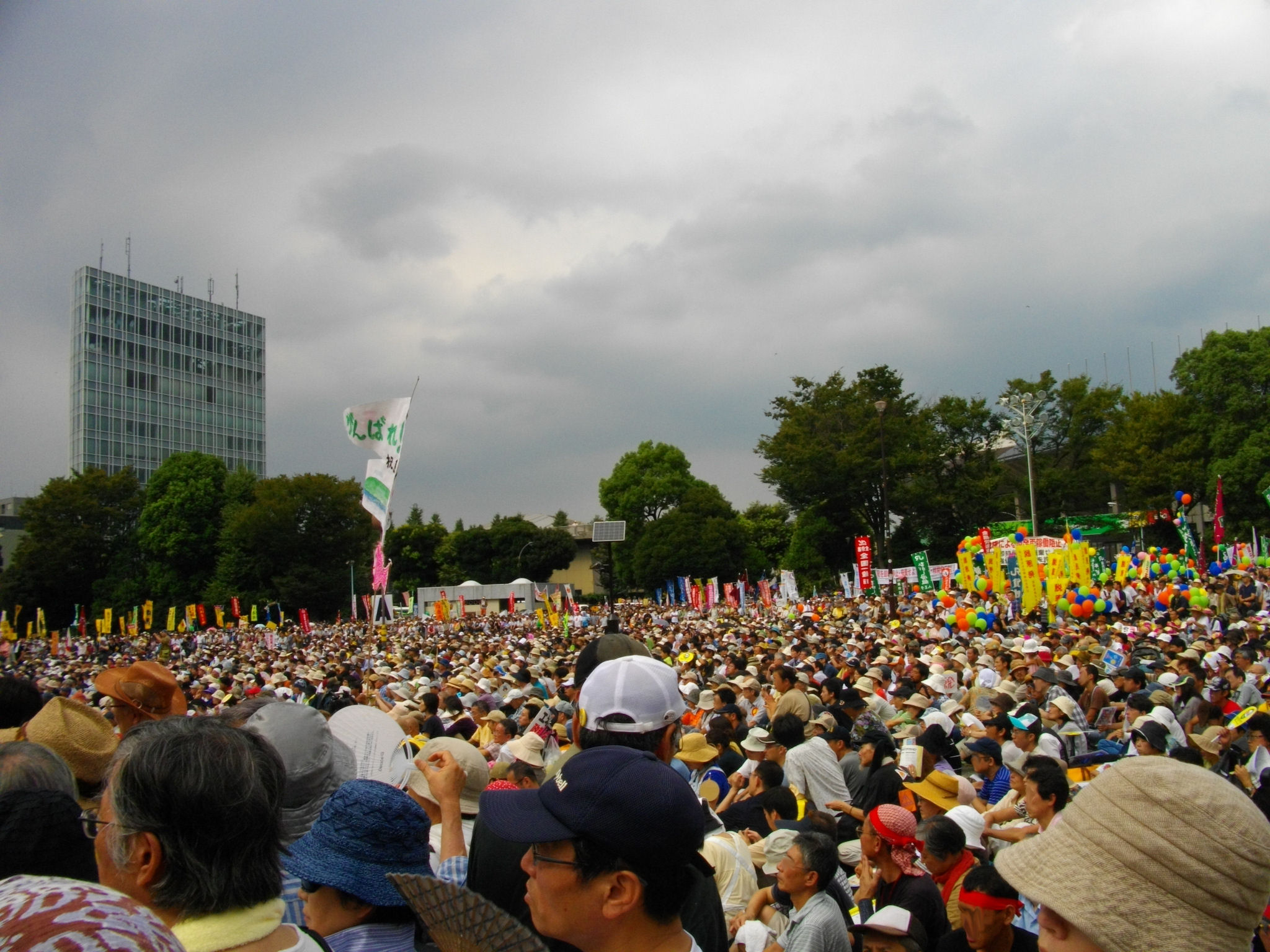
Anti-nuclear power rally on 19 September 2011 at the Meiji Shrine complex in Tokyo. Sixty thousand people marched chanting "Sayonara nuclear power" and waving banners, calling on Japan's government to abandon nuclear power following the Fukushima disaster.

Once a nuclear proponent, Prime Minister Naoto Kan became increasingly anti-nuclear following the Fukushima nuclear disaster. In May 2011, he closed the ageing Hamaoka Nuclear Power Plant over earthquake and tsunami fears, and said he would freeze plans to build new reactors. In July 2011, Kan said that "Japan should reduce and eventually eliminate its dependence on nuclear energy ... saying that the Fukushima accident had demonstrated the dangers of the technology". In August 2011, the Japanese government passed a bill to subsidise electricity from renewable energy sources. A 2011 Japanese Cabinet energy white paper says "public confidence in safety of nuclear power was greatly damaged" by the Fukushima disaster, and called for a reduction in the nation's reliance on nuclear power. As of August 2011, the crippled Fukushima nuclear plant was leaking low levels of radioactivity and areas surrounding it could remain uninhabitable for decades.

By March 2012, one year after the disaster, all but two of Japan's nuclear reactors were shut down; some were damaged by the quake and tsunami. The following year, the last two were taken off-line. Authority to restart the others after scheduled maintenance throughout the year was given to local governments, and in all cases local opposition prevented restarting.

Prime Minister Shinzo Abe's government, reelected on a platform of restarting nuclear power, plans to have nuclear power account for 20 to 22 per cent of the country's total electricity supply by 2030, compared with roughly 30 per cent before the disaster at the Fukushima complex.

In 2015 two reactors at Sendai Nuclear Power Plant have been restarted. In 2016 Ikata-3 restarted and in 2017 Takahama-4 restarted. In 2021 Mihama Nuclear Power Plant unit 3 was restarted.

In 2023, Japan's Cabinet approved a policy to allow new nuclear power reactors to be constructed and operation of existing reactors to be extended from 40 to 60 years.

==== Netherlands ====
In the Netherlands, in 1994, the Dutch parliament voted to phase out nuclear power generation after a discussion of nuclear waste management. Dodewaard nuclear power plant was shut down in 1997. In 1997 the government decided to end Borssele Nuclear Power Station's operating licence, at the end of 2003. In 2003 the Second Balkenende cabinet postponed the shutdown to 2013.

In 2005 the decision was reversed and research in expanding nuclear power was initiated. The reversal was preceded by the publication of the Christian Democratic Appeal's report on sustainable energy. Other coalition parties then conceded. In 2006 the government decided that Borssele nuclear power station would remain open until 2033, if it could comply with the highest safety standards. The owners, Essent and DELTA were to invest 500 million euros in sustainable energy, together with the government, money which the government claims otherwise should have been paid to the plants owners as compensation.

In December 2021, the Fourth Rutte cabinet stated that it wanted to both extend the service life of the Netherlands' sole operational nuclear power reactor at Borssele nuclear power station, and prepare for the construction of two new nuclear power plants, in order to reduce CO_{2} emissions and meet the European Union goals for responding to climate change. Part of this preparation is the launch of a feasibility study, looking at the advantages and disadvantages of the use of nuclear power to respond to climate change.

==== Sweden ====
A year after the Three Mile Island accident in 1979, the 1980 Swedish nuclear power referendum was held. It led to the Swedish parliament deciding that no further nuclear power plants should be built, and that a nuclear power phase-out should be completed by 2010. On 5 February 2009, the Government of Sweden effectively ended the phase-out policy. In 2010, Parliament approved for new reactors to replace existing ones.

The nuclear reactors at the Barsebäck Nuclear Power Plant were shut down between 1999 and 2005. In October 2015, corporations running the nuclear plants decided to phase out two reactors at Oskarshamn and two at Ringhals, reducing the number of remaining reactors from 12 in 1999 to 6 in 2020.

An opinion poll in April 2016 showed that about half of Swedes want to phase out nuclear power, 30 per cent want its use continued, and 20 per cent are undecided. Prior to the Fukushima Daiichi nuclear disaster in 2011, "a clear majority of Swedes" had been in favour of nuclear power. In June 2016, the opposition parties and the government reached an agreement on Swedish nuclear power. The agreement is to phase out the output tax on nuclear power, and allow ten new replacement reactors to be built at current nuclear plants.

Since then, public support of nuclear energy has grown, with a majority of people in favour of nuclear power in 2019. Those in favour of decommissioning nuclear has dropped to a record low of 11 per cent.

In 2023, plans were announced by both Vattenfall and the Swedish government for extending the service life of the country's existing nuclear power reactors, and the construction of a fleet of new reactors, respectively.

==== Switzerland ====
Switzerland nuclear power plants (view)
Active plants
Closed plants

As of 2013, the five operational Swiss nuclear reactors were Beznau 1 and 2, Gösgen, Leibstadt, and Mühleberg—all located in the German speaking part of the country. Nuclear power accounted for 36.4% of the national electricity generation, while 57.9% came from hydroelectricity. The remaining 5.7% was generated by other conventional and non-hydro renewable power stations.

On 25 May 2011, the Federal Council decided on a slow phase-out by not extending running times or building new power plants. The first power plant, Mühleberg, was shut down on 20 December 2019, the last will stop running in 2034.

In 2018, the International Energy Agency has warned that Switzerland's phased withdrawal from nuclear power presents challenges for maintaining its electricity security. They caution that Switzerland will be increasingly relying on imports from its European neighbours to meet electricity demand, especially during the winter months when low water levels impact production from hydro plants.

There have been many Swiss referendums on the topic of nuclear energy, beginning in 1979 with a citizens' initiative for nuclear safety, which was rejected. In 1984, there was a vote on an initiative "for a future without further nuclear power stations" with the result being a 55% to 45% vote against. On 23 September 1990, Switzerland had two more referendums about nuclear power. The initiative "stop the construction of nuclear power stations", which proposed a ten-year moratorium on the construction of new nuclear power plants, was passed with 54.5% to 45.5%. The initiative for a phase-out was rejected with by 53% to 47.1%. In 2000, there was a vote on a green tax for support of solar energy. It was rejected by 67% to 31%. On 18 May 2003, there were two referendums: "Electricity without Nuclear", asking for a decision on a nuclear power phase-out, and "Moratorium Plus", for an extension of the earlier-decided moratorium on the construction of new nuclear power plants. Both were turned down. The results were: Moratorium Plus: 41.6% Yes, 58.4% No; Electricity without Nuclear: 33.7% Yes, 66.3% No.

The program of the "Electricity without Nuclear" petition was to shut down all nuclear power stations by 2033, starting with Unit 1 and 2 of Beznau nuclear power stations, Mühleberg in 2005, Gösgen in 2009, and Leibstadt in 2014. "Moratorium Plus" was for an extension of the moratorium for another ten years, and additionally a condition to stop the present reactors after 40 years of operation. To extend the 40 years by ten more years, another referendum would have to be held (at high administrative costs). The rejection of the Moratorium Plus had come as a surprise to many, as opinion polls before the referendum had showed acceptance. Reasons for the rejections in both cases were seen as the worsened economic situation.

In August 2024, the Federal Council, led by Energy Minister Albert Rösti, proposed lifting the nuclear power plant construction ban that had been in place since 2017. Citing concerns over energy security and fossil fuel phase-out, the government seeks to amend the Nuclear Energy Act (Kernenergiegesetz) to allow the construction of new nuclear plants and extend the operational life of the existing ones. On 18 June 2026, the repeal of the ban was approved by the Federal Assembly. In September 2026, opponents of the repeal successfully triggered a referendum on the issue.

=== Phase-outs reversed after completion ===
==== Italy ====
A nuclear power phase-out commenced in Italy in 1987, one year after the Chernobyl disaster. Following a referendum in that year, Italy's four nuclear power plants were closed, the last in 1990. A moratorium on the construction of new plants, originally in effect from 1987 until 1993, has since been extended indefinitely.

In recent years, Italy has been an importer of nuclear-generated electricity, and its largest electricity utility Enel S.p.A. has been investing in reactors in both France and Slovakia to provide this electricity in the future, and also in the development of the EPR technology.

In October 2005, there was a seminar sponsored by the government about the possibility of reviving Italian nuclear power. The fourth cabinet led by Silvio Berlusconi tried to implement a new nuclear plan but a referendum held in June 2011 stopped any project.

In February 2025, the Italian government approved a law to begin the process of overturning the ban on new nuclear power in the country. The law was approved by the Italian Parliament in September 2026.

==== Kazakhstan ====
Kazakhstan shut down its only previously-operating nuclear power plant at Aktau in 1999. However in 2026, the Kazakh government formally approved plans for a return to nuclear power generation in the country, including the construction of at least three new power plants.

==== Taiwan ====
Taiwan had three active nuclear power plants as of 2016. Active seismic faults run across the island, and some environmentalists argue Taiwan is unsuited for nuclear plants.

Construction of the Lungmen Nuclear Power Plant using the ABWR design encountered public opposition and a host of delays, and in April 2014 the government decided to halt construction. Construction was stopped in July 2015.

The 2016 general election was won by a government with stated policies that included phasing out nuclear power generation by 2025. The formal phase-out plan was announced in October 2016. A proposal to complete construction of the Lungmen plant was rejected in a referendum in 2021.

The last operating nuclear power station in Taiwan, Maanshan Nuclear Power Plant, was shut down in May 2025. A referendum was held on 23 August 2025 on the issue of restarting the Maanshan plant but fell short of the threshold of 25% in favour needed of eligible voters to be successful, coming in at 21.7% (74.2% of voters).

===== Reversal =====
In March 2026, in an abrupt reversal of the ruling Democratic Progressive Party's long-standing 'nuclear-free homeland' policy, President of Taiwan William Lai announced plans to restart two of Taiwan's three previously operating nuclear power plants, Maanshan Nuclear Power Plant and Guosheng Nuclear Power Plant. The third plant, Jinshan Nuclear Power Plant, had been shut down for too long to be able to be restarted.

Shortly after the president's announcement, the Taiwan Power Company formally applied to the Nuclear Safety Commission to restart the Maanshan plant, aiming to restart it in 2028, and the Guosheng plant in 2029.

== Other significant places ==
=== Americas ===
==== United States ====
The United States, as of 2013, was undergoing a practical phase-out independent of stated goals and continued official support. This was not due to concerns about the source or anti-nuclear groups, but due to the rapidly falling prices of natural gas and the reluctance of investors to provide funding for long-term projects when short term profitability of turbine power is available.

Through the 2000s, a number of factors led to greatly increased interest in new nuclear reactors, including rising demand, new lower-cost reactor designs, and concerns about global climate change. By 2009, about 30 new reactors were planned, and a large number of existing reactors had applied for upgrades to increase their output. In total, 39 reactors had their licences renewed, three Early Site Permits had been applied for, and three consortiums had applied for Combined Construction-Operating Licences under the Nuclear Power 2010 Program. In addition, the Energy Policy Act of 2005 contains incentives to further expand nuclear power.

However, by 2012 the vast majority of these plans were cancelled, and several additional cancellations followed in 2013. Currently only three new reactors are under construction, and one, at Watts Bar, was originally planned in the 1970s and only under construction now. Construction of the new AP1000 design is underway at one location in the United States in Georgia. Plans for additional reactors in Florida were cancelled in 2013.

Some smaller reactors operating in deregulated markets have become uneconomic to operate and maintain, due to competition from generators using low priced natural gas, and may be retired early. The 556 MWe Kewaunee Power Station is being closed 20 years before licence expiry for these economic reasons. Duke Energy's Crystal River 3 Nuclear Power Plant in Florida closed, as it could not recover the costs needed to fix its containment building.

As a result of these changes, after reaching peak production in 2007, US nuclear capacity has been undergoing constant reduction every year.

In 2021, Indian Point Energy Center, the last remaining nuclear power plant in the New York City metropolitan area, was shut down. Environmental groups celebrated the decision to close the plant, while critics pointed to the sites generation being replaced by two gas fired power plants resulting in an increase of fossil fuel consumption and carbon dioxide emissions.

=== Asia ===
Renewable energy, mainly hydropower, is gaining share.

For North Korea, two PWRs at Kumho were under construction until that was suspended in November 2003. On 19 September 2005, North Korea pledged to stop building nuclear weapons and agreed to international inspections in return for energy aid, which may include one or more light water reactors – the agreement said "The other parties expressed their respect and agreed to discuss at an appropriate time the subject of the provision of light-water reactor" [sic]. North Korea has since continued with its nuclear weapons development program.

In July 2000, the Turkish government decided not to build four reactors at the controversial Akkuyu Nuclear Power Plant, but later changed its mind. The official launch ceremony took place in April 2015, and the first unit was expected to be completed in 2020.

India has 20 reactors operating, 6 reactors under construction, and is planning an additional 24.

Vietnam had developed detailed plans for 2 nuclear power plants with 8 reactors, but in November 2016 decided to abandon nuclear power plans as they were "not economically viable because of other cheaper sources of power."

==== Philippines ====
In the Philippines, in 2004, President Gloria Macapagal Arroyo outlined her energy policy. Regarding nuclear energy, she made public plans to convert the (completed but never commissioned) Bataan Nuclear Power Plant (BNPP) into a gas-powered facility. These plans did not come to fruition, and by 2024, the government of President Bongbong Marcos signed an agreement with Korea Hydro & Nuclear Power, for the latter to conduct a feasibility study on refurbishing the BNPP and commissioning it into service in its originally intended configuration of a nuclear power station.

==== South Korea ====
In 2017, responding to widespread public concerns after the Fukushima Daiichi nuclear disaster in Japan, the high earthquake risk in South Korea, and a 2013 nuclear scandal involving the use of counterfeit parts, the new government of President Moon Jae-in had decided to gradually phase out nuclear power in South Korea. Such decision, however, was met with widespread criticism regarding its political transparency and various doubts regarding its process. This was especially highlighted when the construction of Shin Gori units 5 and 6 were unilaterally stopped by the government. Being faced with stark criticism, the construction of Shin Gori units 5 and 6 were eventually restarted.

Later into the administrative period, the Moon Jae-in government and its nuclear phase-out policy is facing heavier criticism than before, from both the opposing parties as well as general public due to lack of realistic alternative, consequential increase in electricity price, negative effects on the related industries, public consensus of needs to reduce carbon footprint and the decrease of popularity due to other political and economic failures. Surveys from 2021 show that the support for nuclear phase out has drastically reduced, although the details differ from majority support to majority disapproval depending on the survey. President Moon reversed his government's nuclear phaseout policy just before the election in February 2022.

In the 2022 election, candidate Yoon Seok-Yeol promised to cancel the phase out if elected and continue running all plants as long as they safely could be operated, develop new technology and become a global export powerhouse. Yoon went on to win a close election in what was seen as a big win for the nuclear sector.

=== Europe ===
==== Austria ====
A nuclear power station was built during the 1970s at Zwentendorf, Austria, but its start-up was prevented by a referendum in 1978. On 9 July 1997, the Austrian Parliament voted unanimously to maintain the country's anti-nuclear policy. The built but never used reactor was converted into a museum and has also been used as a movie set and to train people involved in various aspects of nuclear power and safety. It is uniquely suitable for this purpose as it includes every aspect of an actual nuclear power plant except the radiation.

==== Denmark ====
The Folketing passed a resolution in 1985 banning the construction of nuclear power plants in the country. However by 2025, Denmark was reported to be considering scrapping this prohibition.

==== Greece ====
Greece operates only a single small nuclear reactor in the Greek National Physics Research Laboratory in Demokritus Laboratories for research purposes.

==== Ireland ====
In Ireland, a nuclear power plant was first proposed in 1968. It was to be built during the 1970s at Carnsore Point in County Wexford. The plan called for first one, then ultimately four plants to be built at the site, but it was dropped after strong opposition from environmental groups, and Ireland has remained without nuclear power since.

Despite opposing nuclear power (and nuclear fuel reprocessing at Sellafield), Ireland imports electricity from the United Kingdom via several interconnectors, which is, in some part, the product of nuclear power.

==== Serbia ====
Serbia currently operates a single nuclear research reactor in the Vinča Institute. Previously, the Vinča Institute had two active reactors: RA and RB. In a 1958 nuclear incident, six workers received a critical amount of radiation and one of them died. These workers received the first bone marrow transplants in Europe. After the Chernobyl disaster in 1989, a moratorium on the use of nuclear energy was in established. Later, the law prohibited the use of nuclear energy. To this day, the Directorate for Nuclear and Radiation Safety (Srbatom) is strongly opposed to any kind of nuclear energy use in Serbia or neighbouring countries.

==== Slovenia ====
Krško Nuclear Power Plant in Slovenia (co-owned with Croatia) was originally scheduled to be closed by 2023. The debate on whether and when to close the Krško plant was somewhat intensified after the 2005/06 winter energy crisis. In May 2006, the Ljubljana-based daily Dnevnik claimed Slovenian government officials internally proposed adding a new 1000 MW block into Krško after the year 2020. In 2023, the service life of the Krško plant was extended to 2043, and as of 2024, the construction of a second reactor at the plant was being considered.

== Pros and cons of nuclear power ==
=== The nuclear debate ===
The nuclear power debate is about the controversy which has surrounded the deployment and use of nuclear fission reactors to generate electricity from nuclear fuel for civilian purposes. The debate about nuclear power peaked during the 1970s and 1980s, when it "reached an intensity unprecedented in the history of technology controversies", in some countries.

Proponents of nuclear energy argue that nuclear power is a sustainable energy source which reduces carbon emissions and can increase energy security if its use supplants a dependence on imported fuels. Proponents cite scientific studies affirming the consensus that nuclear power produces virtually no air pollution, in contrast to the chief dispatchable alternative of fossil fuel. Proponents also believe that nuclear power is the only viable course to achieve energy independence for most Western countries. They emphasise that the risks of storing spent fuel are small and can be further reduced by using the latest technology in newer reactors, fuel recycling, and long-lived radioisotope burn-up. For instance, spent nuclear fuel in the United States could extend nuclear power generation by hundreds of years because more than 90% of spent fuel can be reprocessed. The operational safety record in the Western world is excellent when compared to the other major kinds of power plants.

Over 10,000 hospitals worldwide use radioisotopes in medicine, and about 90% of the procedures are for diagnosis. The radioisotope most commonly used in diagnosis is technetium-99, which is employed in about 40 million procedures per year, thereby accounting for about 80% of all nuclear medicine procedures and 85% of diagnostic scans in nuclear medicine worldwide. The main radioisotopes such as Tc-99m cannot effectively be produced without reactors. Most smoke detectors use americium-241, meaning every American home uses these common radioisotopes to improve their safety from fire.

Opponents say that nuclear power poses many threats to people and the environment. These threats include health risks and environmental damage from uranium mining, processing and transport, the risk of nuclear weapons proliferation or sabotage, and the problem of radioactive nuclear waste management. They also contend that reactors themselves are enormously complex machines where many things can and do go wrong, and there have been serious nuclear accidents. Critics do not believe that these risks can be reduced through new technology. They argue that when all the energy-intensive stages of the nuclear fuel chain are considered, from uranium mining to nuclear decommissioning, nuclear power is not a low-carbon electricity source. This criticism has however been partially quelled by the IPCC which indicated in 2014 that nuclear energy was a low carbon energy production technology, comparable to wind and lower than solar in that regard.

=== Economics ===
The economics of new nuclear power plants is a controversial subject, since there are diverging views on the topic, and multi-billion dollar investments ride on the choice of an energy source. Nuclear power plants typically have high capital costs for building the plant, but low direct fuel costs (with, however, much of the costs of fuel extraction, processing, use and long term storage externalised). Therefore, comparison with other power generation methods is strongly dependent on assumptions about construction timescales and capital financing for nuclear plants. Cost estimates also need to take into account plant decommissioning and nuclear waste storage costs. On the other hand, measures to mitigate global warming, such as a carbon tax or carbon emissions trading, may favour the economics of nuclear power versus fossil fuels.

In recent years there has been a slowdown of electricity demand growth and financing has become more difficult, which affects large projects such as nuclear reactors, with very large upfront costs and long project cycles which carry a large variety of risks. In Eastern Europe, a number of long-established projects are struggling to find finance, notably Belene in Bulgaria and the additional reactors at Cernavoda in Romania, and some potential backers have pulled out. Where cheap natural gas is available and its future supply relatively secure, this also poses a major problem for nuclear projects.

Analysis of the economics of nuclear power must take into account who bears the risks of future uncertainties. To date, all operating nuclear power plants were developed by state-owned or regulated utility monopolies where many of the risks associated with construction costs, operating performance, fuel price, and other factors were borne by consumers rather than suppliers. Many countries have now liberalised the electricity market where these risks, and the risk of cheaper competitors emerging before capital costs are recovered, are borne by plant suppliers and operators rather than consumers, which leads to a significantly different evaluation of the economics of new nuclear power plants.

Following the 2011 Fukushima Daiichi nuclear disaster, costs are likely to go up for currently operating and new nuclear power plants, due to increased requirements for on-site spent fuel management and elevated design basis threats.

=== Environment ===
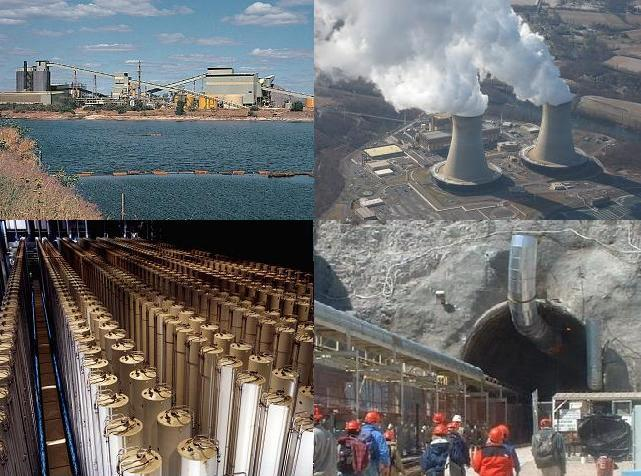
Nuclear power activities involving the environment; mining, enrichment, generation and geological disposal.

The environmental impact of nuclear power results from the nuclear fuel cycle, operation, and the effects of nuclear accidents.

The greenhouse gas emissions from nuclear fission power are small relative to those associated with coal, oil, gas, and biomass. They are about equal to those associated with wind and hydroelectric.

The routine health risks from nuclear fission power are very small relative to those associated with coal, oil, gas, solar, biomass, wind and hydroelectric.

However, there is a "catastrophic risk" potential if containment fails, which in nuclear reactors can be brought about by over-heated fuels melting and releasing large quantities of fission products into the environment. The public is sensitive to these risks and there has been considerable public opposition to nuclear power. Even so, in comparing the fatalities for major accidents alone in the energy sector, it is still found that the risks associated with nuclear power are extremely small relative to those associated with coal, oil, gas and hydroelectric. For the operation of a 1000-MWe nuclear power plant, the complete nuclear fuel cycle, from mining to reactor operation to waste disposal, the radiation dose is cited as 136 person-rem/year. The dose is 490 person-rem/year for an equivalent coal-fired power plant.

The 1979 Three Mile Island accident and 1986 Chernobyl disaster, along with high construction costs, ended the rapid growth of global nuclear power capacity. A further disastrous release of radioactive materials followed the 2011 Japanese tsunami which damaged the Fukushima I Nuclear Power Plant, resulting in hydrogen gas explosions and partial meltdowns classified as a Level 7 event. The large-scale release of radioactivity resulted in people being evacuated from a 20 km exclusion zone set up around the power plant, similar to the 30 km radius Chernobyl Exclusion Zone remains in effect. Subsequent scientific assessment of the health impacts of radiation has shown that these evacuations were more damaging than the radiation could have been, and recommend that the population be advised to remain in place in all but the most severe radiological release events.

In May 2023, the Washington Post wrote, "Had Germany kept its nuclear plants running from 2010, it could have slashed its use of coal for electricity to 13 percent by now. Today’s figure is 31 percent... Already more lives might have been lost just in Germany because of air pollution from coal power than from all of the world’s nuclear accidents to date, Fukushima and Chernobyl included."

=== Accidents ===
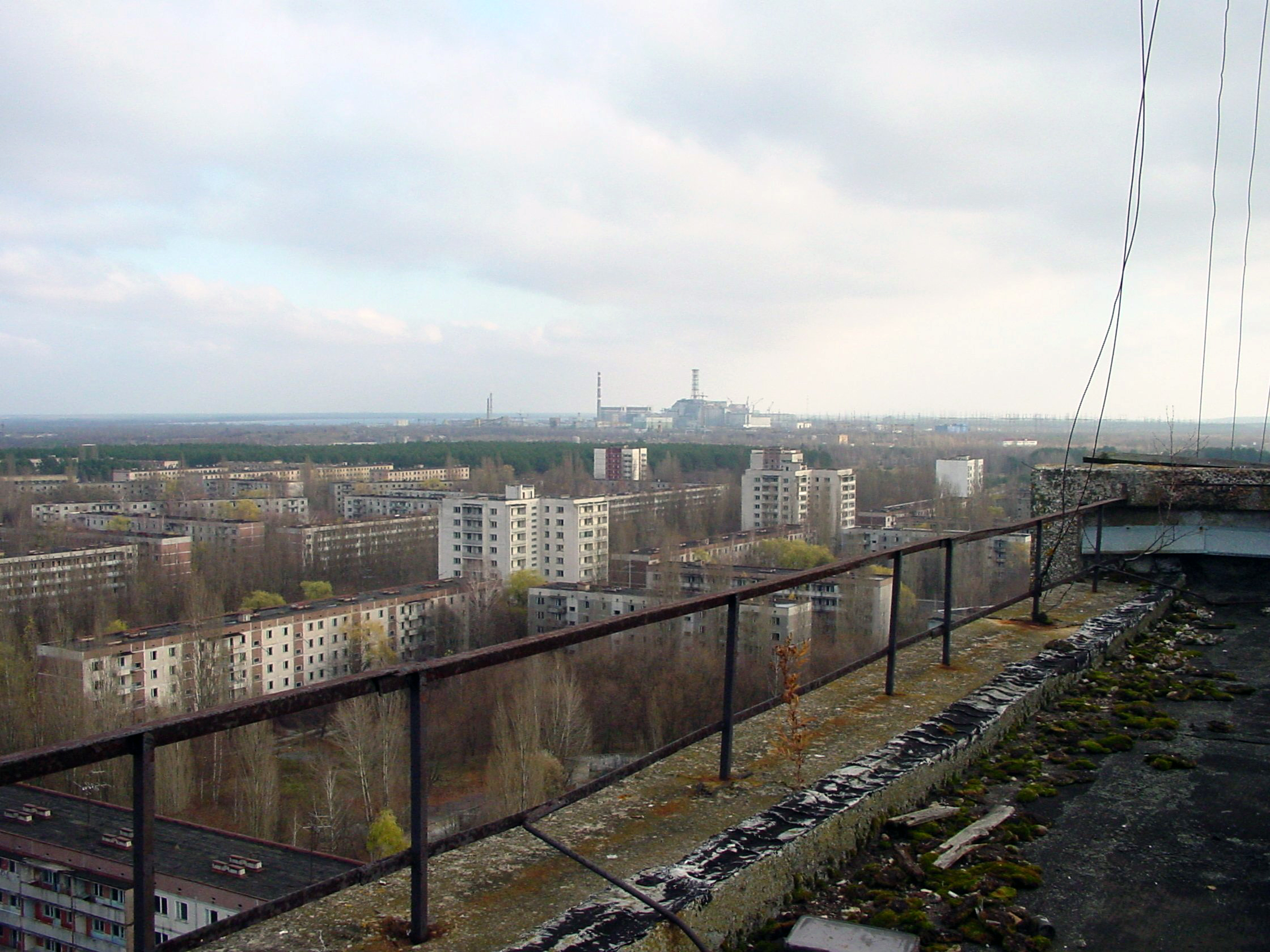
The abandoned city of Pripyat with the Chernobyl nuclear power plant in the distance

The effect of nuclear accidents has been a topic of debate practically since the first nuclear reactors were constructed. It has also been a key factor in public concern about nuclear facilities. Some technical measures to reduce the risk of accidents or to minimise the amount of radioactivity released to the environment have been adopted. Despite the use of such measures, human error remains, and "there have been many accidents with varying effects as well near misses and incidents".

Benjamin K. Sovacool has reported that worldwide there have been 99 accidents at nuclear power plants. Fifty-seven accidents have occurred since the Chernobyl disaster, and 57% (56 out of 99) of all nuclear-related accidents have occurred in the USA. Serious nuclear power plant accidents include the Fukushima Daiichi nuclear disaster (2011), Chernobyl disaster (1986), Three Mile Island accident (1979), and the SL-1 accident (1961). Stuart Arm states, "apart from Chernobyl, no nuclear workers or members of the public have ever died as a result of exposure to radiation due to a commercial nuclear reactor incident."

The International Atomic Energy Agency maintains a website reporting recent accidents.

=== Safety ===
Nuclear safety and security covers the actions taken to prevent nuclear and radiation accidents or to limit their consequences. This covers nuclear power plants as well as all other nuclear facilities, the transportation of nuclear materials, and the use and storage of nuclear materials for medical, power, industry, and military uses.

Although there is no way to guarantee that a reactor will always be designed, built and operated safely, the nuclear power industry has improved the safety and performance of reactors, and has proposed safer reactor designs, though many of these designs have yet to be tested at industrial or commercial scales. Mistakes do occur and the designers of reactors at Fukushima in Japan did not anticipate that a tsunami generated by an earthquake would disable the backup systems that were supposed to stabilise the reactor after the earthquake. According to UBS AG, the Fukushima I nuclear accidents have cast doubt on whether even an advanced economy like Japan can master nuclear energy safety. Catastrophic scenarios involving terrorist attacks are also conceivable.

An interdisciplinary team from MIT have estimated that given the expected growth of nuclear power from 2005 to 2055, at least four serious nuclear accidents would be expected in that period. To date, there have been five serious accidents (core damage) in the world since 1970 (one at Three Mile Island in 1979; one at Chernobyl in 1986; and three at Fukushima-Daiichi in 2011), corresponding to the beginning of the operation of generation II reactors. This leads to on average of one serious accident happening every eight years worldwide. Despite these accidents and public opinion, the safety record of nuclear power, in terms of lives lost (ignoring nonfatal illnesses) per unit of electricity delivered, is at least as good as every other major source of power in the world, on par with solar and wind.

== Energy transition ==
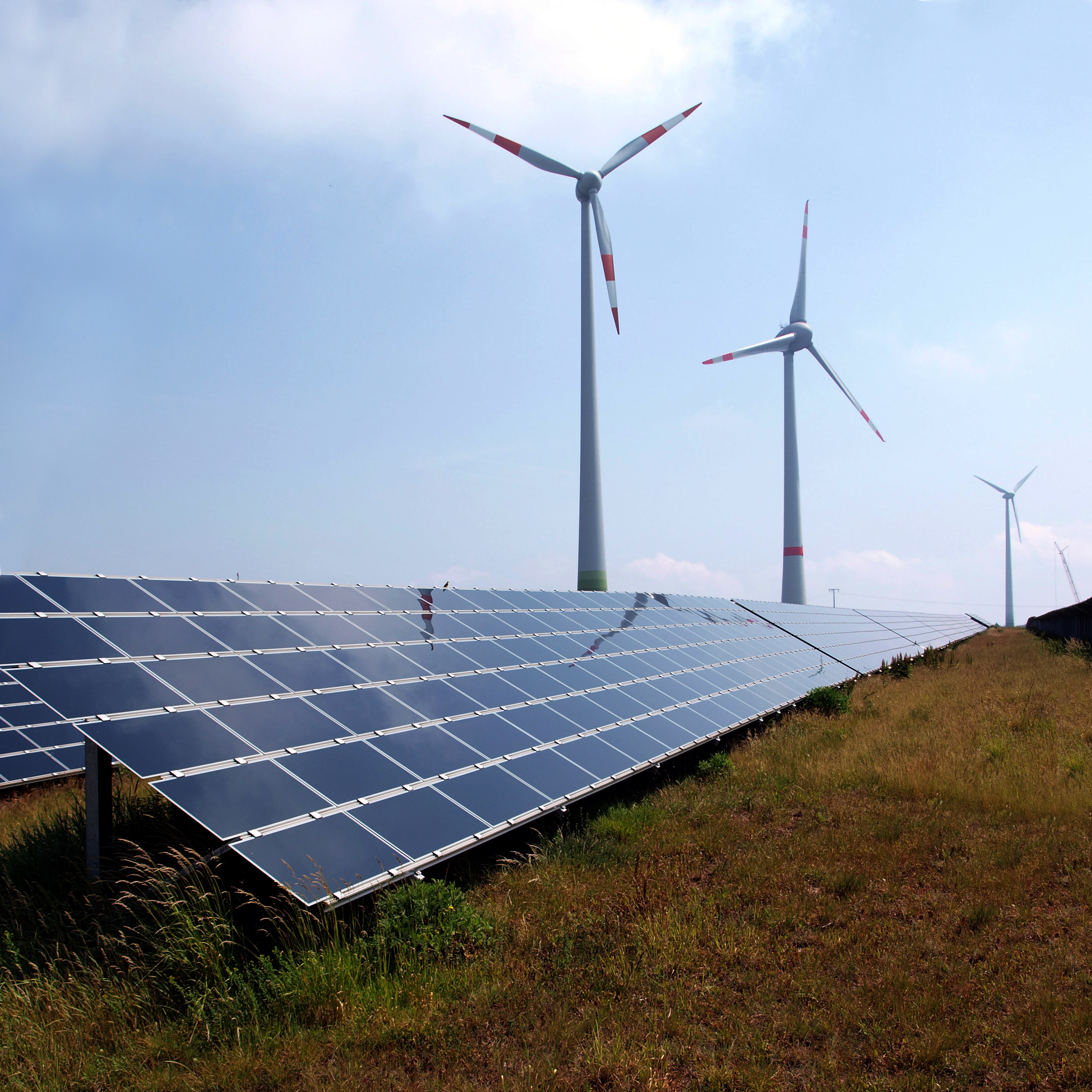
Photovoltaic array and wind turbines at the Schneebergerhof wind farm in the German state of Rheinland-Pfalz

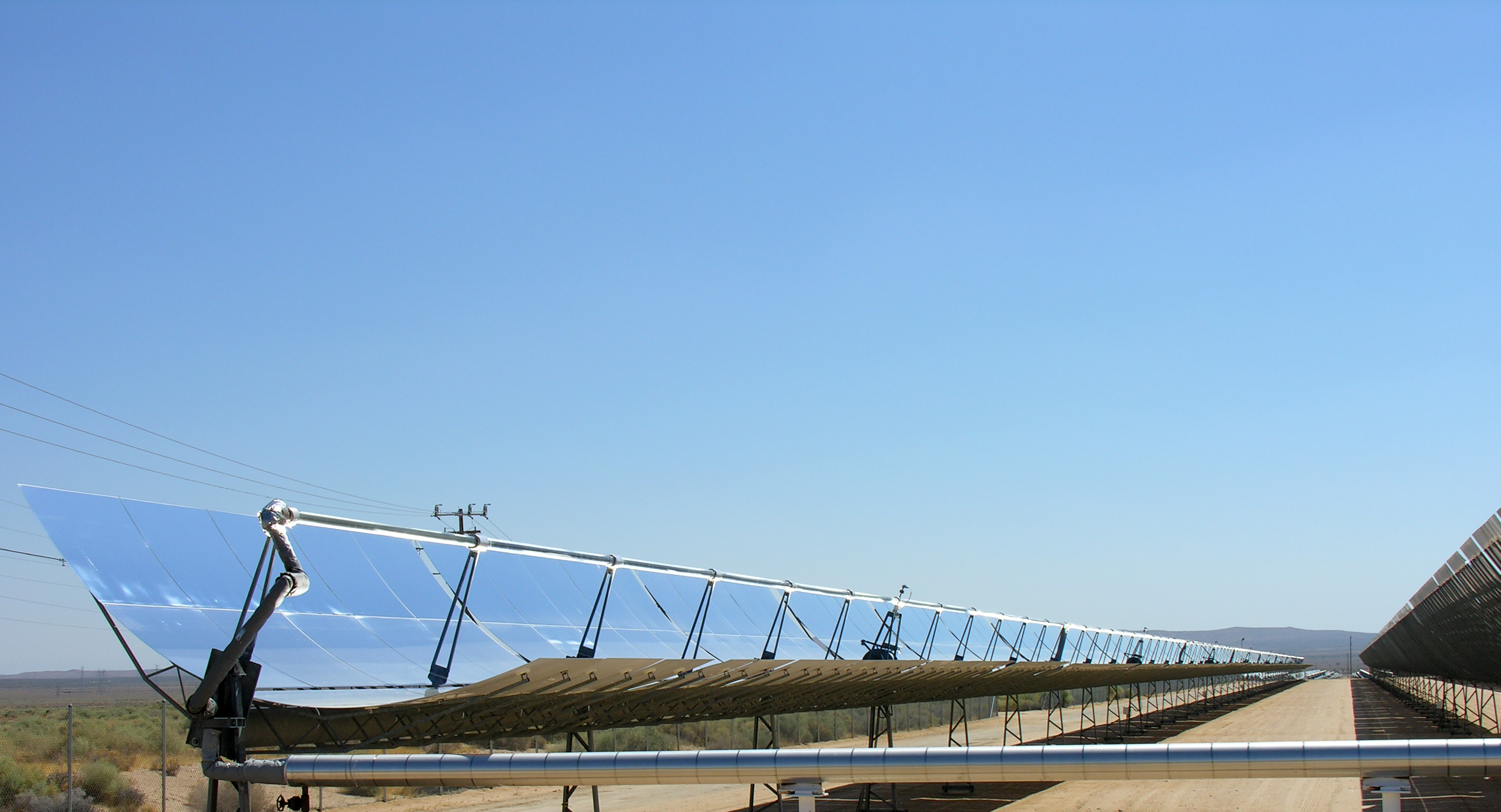
Parabolic trough power plant for electricity production, near the town of Kramer Junction in the California Mojave Desert

Global public support for energy sources, based on a survey by Ipsos (2011)

Energy transition is the shift by several countries to sustainable economies by means of renewable energy, energy efficiency and sustainable development. This trend has been augmented by diversifying electricity generation and allowing homes and businesses with solar panels on their rooftops to sell electricity to the grid. In the future this could "lead to a majority of our energy coming from decentralized solar panels and wind turbines scattered across the country" rather than large power plants. The final goal of German proponents of a nuclear power phase-out is the abolishment of coal and other non-renewable energy sources.

Issues exist that currently prevent a shift to 100% renewable technologies. There is debate over the environmental impact of solar power, and the environmental impact of wind power. Some argue that the pollution produced and requirement of rare-earth elements offsets many of the benefits compared to other alternative power sources such as hydroelectric, geothermal, and nuclear power.

== See also ==
- Nuclear renaissance
- Anti-nuclear movement
- As low as reasonably practicable
- Energy conservation
- Energy development
- Fossil fuel phase-out
- List of energy topics
- Nuclear Non-Proliferation Treaty
- Nuclear energy policy
- Nuclear energy policy by country
- Nuclear power controversy
- Nuclear power in France
- Renewable energy commercialisation
- Wind power
