= Nuclear power in Austria =

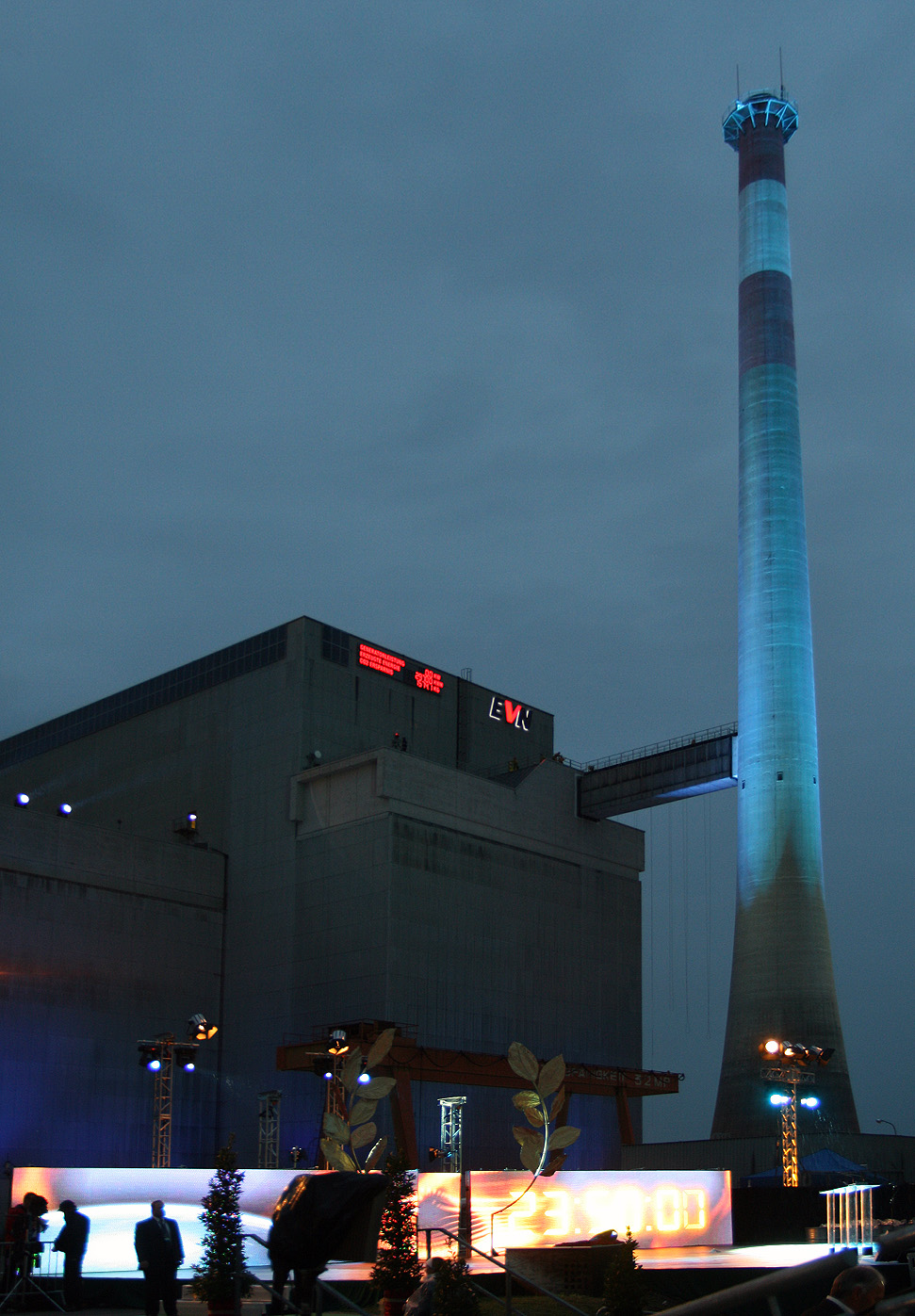
The site of Zwentendorf Nuclear Power Plant in 2009

In the 1960s the Austrian government started a nuclear-energy program and parliament unanimously ordered a nuclear power-plant built. In 1972, the German company KWU began construction of the Zwentendorf Nuclear Power Plant boiling-water 700 MWe reactor. In 1976, two years prior to the nuclear power-plant opening, the government began a program to educate its citizens on the benefits and safety of nuclear power. However, this campaign began a public discussion that led to large demonstrations against the Zwentendorf plant in 1977.

On 15 December 1978, the Austrian Parliament voted in favor of a ban (BGBI. No. 676) on using nuclear fission for Austria’s energy supply until March 1998. This law also prohibits the storage and transport of nuclear materials in or through Austria. Nuclear energy continued to be debated in Austria, with some politicians seeking to reverse the nuclear-energy ban. However, after the 1986 Chernobyl accident, attempts to reverse the ban subsided. On 9 July 1997, the Austrian Parliament unanimously passed legislation to remain an anti-nuclear country.. In 1999, Austria passed the Federal Constitutional Act for a Nuclear-Free Austria, which prohibits the construction and operation of nuclear power plants in the country.

In 2012, Austria called on Europe to abandon nuclear power. Austria has particularly sought to pressure the Czech Republic to dismantle the Temelín Nuclear Power Station near the Austrian border. The Czech Republic has defended the nuclear power-plant as safe and better than alternatives such as dependence on coal, gas, and oil.

In 2022, Austria filed a legal challenge to prevent the European Union from including nuclear energy as a category of green investment. Leonore Gewessler, Austria's Federal Minister for Climate Protection, said it was "greenwashing". Defenders of the categorization see nuclear energy, which produces low carbon-emissions relative to many energy sources, as key to reducing greenhouse-gas emissions.

== See also ==
- Anti-nuclear movement in Austria
