= Nuclear power in Malaysia =

The Malaysian Nuclear Agency periodically reviews nuclear power as an option to meet the increasing demands of energy in Malaysia. There is a need to build a nuclear power generation plant, with plans still in the feasibility stage.

== Status ==
However, due to prior concern from the Fukushima Daiichi nuclear disaster in 2011, plans to have a nuclear reactor have been postponed. Neighbouring Vietnam has also made a declaration to ditch their future nuclear energy plans. Minister in the Prime Minister's Department Nancy Shukri stated in 2016 that Malaysia will only build their plant after 2022, although the country has met the requirements based from observations by the International Atomic Energy Agency (IAEA). Following the change of government in Malaysian administration, the new government has decided to cancel the plan for the construction of nuclear power plants to generate electricity as "science itself were still unable to find proper ways to dispose nuclear waste".
