= Nuclear power in Greece =

Although Greece has established the Greek Atomic Energy Commission (Greek: Ελληνική Επιτροπή Ατομικής Ενέργειας, ΕΕΑΕ), a decision has been made not to implement a nuclear power program to generate electricity.

There is one operational nuclear research reactor in the Demokritos Research Institute and one sub-critical assembly. The country believes that due to its small size and frequent earthquakes in the region with Italy, and Turkey, nuclear power would not provide many benefits. Greece did receive electricity produced by nuclear power from Bulgaria in the past. However, with the shutdown of two Bulgarian reactors in 2006, these imports are almost non-existent.

== See also ==
- Energy in Greece
