= Nuclear power in Israel =

While Israel operates nuclear research reactors, it has no nuclear power plants. However, the possibility of constructing nuclear power plants in the country has been considered at various times over the years.

== Nuclear power reactors ==
=== History ===
Historically, the topic of constructing nuclear power plants in Israel has occasionally been brought up for discussion among Israeli government circles.

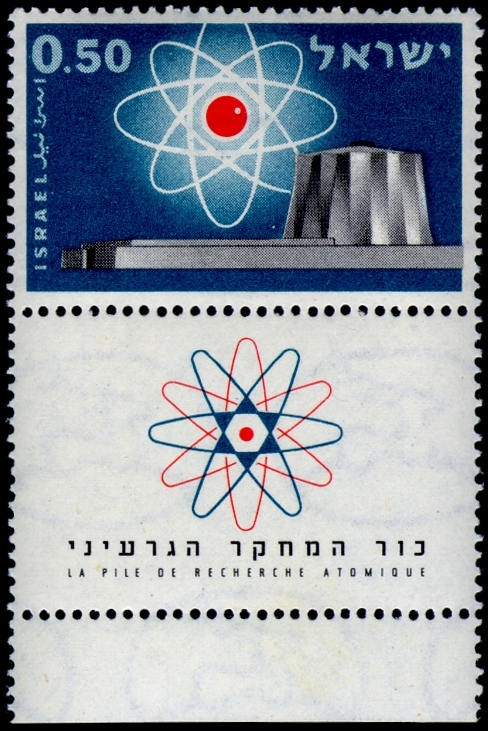
1960 Israeli stamp featuring the Soreq Nuclear Research Center

On 26 August 1958, then Israeli Finance Minister Levi Eshkol announced the government's intention to build a nuclear power plant. Over the next three decades talks were held with various American administrations to help advance this effort but none came to fruition.

In January 2007, Israeli Infrastructure Minister Binyamin Ben-Eliezer said his country should consider producing nuclear power for civilian purposes.

As a result of the nuclear power emergencies at Japan's Fukushima I Nuclear Power Plant, Prime Minister Benjamin Netanyahu said on 17 March 2011, "I don't think we're going to pursue civil nuclear energy in the coming years."

As of November 2015, the Ministry of National Infrastructure, Energy and Water Resources is considering nuclear power in order to reduce greenhouse gas emissions 25% by 2030.

=== Factors affecting nuclear power in Israel ===
Several factors have contributed to the fact that no nuclear power plants have been built in Israel over the years. One is the fact that Israel is not a signatory to the Treaty on the Non-Proliferation of Nuclear Weapons, which makes it more difficult for the country to engage with international suppliers of nuclear technology. Another reason is that very large deposits of natural gas have been found offshore the Israeli coastline beginning in the 2010s. The exploitation of these deposits allow for generating electricity at very cost-effective rates as compared to generating electricity using nuclear power.

=== Potential site ===
Since the 1980s, a site near Shivta in the Negev desert has been designated as the future location of a nuclear power plant. In 2007, a twin reactor facility of 1200-1500 MWe, to be placed under IAEA safeguards, was considered for the site, with possible opening by 2020.

Previously, a site near Nitzanim, within the Nitzanim Sands by the Mediterranean coast was considered but was rejected in the 1970s due to strong opposition from nearby residents.

== Research reactors ==
=== IRR-2 ===
Israel operates a heavy water cooled and moderated nuclear reactor called "IRR-2" (Israel Research Reactor-2) at the Negev Nuclear Research Center (NRCN) near Dimona officially for research purposes, although many believe the installation's true purpose is the production of nuclear materials for use in Israel's nuclear weapons. This reactor does not operate under the inspection regime of the International Atomic Energy Agency (IAEA). The NRCN also hosts a "national radioactive waste disposal site" for "Radioactive waste from hospitals, research institutions, higher education facilities and factories".

=== IRR-1 ===
IRR-1, a small 5 MW open pool light water reactor exists at the Soreq Nuclear Research Center in central Israel. This reactor operates under the safeguards of the International Atomic Energy Agency.

== See also ==
- Israel Atomic Energy Commission
- Energy in Israel
- Nuclear weapons of Israel
