= Nuclear power in Ireland =

The Single Electricity Market encompassing the entire island of Ireland does not, and has never, produced any electricity from nuclear power stations. The production of electricity for the Irish national grid (Eirgrid), by nuclear fission, is prohibited in the Republic of Ireland by the Electricity Regulation Act, 1999 (Section 18). The enforcement of this law is only possible within the borders of Ireland, and it does not prohibit consumption. Since 2001 in Northern Ireland and 2012 in the Republic, the grid has become increasingly interconnected with the neighbouring electric grid of Britain, and therefore Ireland is now partly powered by overseas nuclear fission stations.

Ireland did, however, host a small student training reactor at University College Cork; the dismantled reactor's uranium remained in secure storage on campus in the 2000s, and in 2003 The Irish Times reported that it had generated no power and was not a commercial reactor.

A ‘Eurobarometer’ survey in 2007 indicated that 27 percent of the citizens of Ireland were in favour of an “increased use” of nuclear energy. More recent polling suggested a more divided picture. In 2021, an Ireland Thinks poll for The Good Information Project found respondents evenly split on whether Ireland should build a nuclear power station, with 43% in favour and 43% opposed. In 2026, The Irish Times reported that a Red C survey for KPMG found that one in three Irish adults backed the construction of nuclear power plants in Ireland, while opposition remained higher at about 45%.

Debate over nuclear power in Ireland revived in the 2020s, with the Workers' Party adopting a pro-nuclear policy in 2023 and both former Green Party leader Eamon Ryan and Taoiseach Micheál Martin expressing greater openness to nuclear power in 2026.

== Electricity security ==
According to the Sustainable Energy Authority of Ireland's 2024 report, Ireland remained highly dependent on fossil fuels in 2023, which supplied 82.7% of the country's energy needs. In electricity, natural gas accounted for 44.3% of gross supply, wind for 33.7%, and net imports for 9.5%. Electricity demand rose by 1.24 TWh in 2023, with commercial services, including data centres, accounting for 41.2% of demand.

Coal-fired generation at Moneypoint power station ended in June 2025, six months earlier than planned, although the station remains available as an oil-fired generator of last resort for security of supply until 2029.

== Carnsore Point ==
A nuclear power plant was proposed in 1968, and resulted in the creation of the Nuclear Energy Board. It was to be built during the 1970s at Carnsore Point in County Wexford by the Electricity Supply Board. The plan envisioned four reactors to be built at the site, but was dropped in 1981 after strong opposition from anti-nuclear lobby groups throughout the 1970s, particularly in 1978 with concerts and rallies being held at Carnsore Point attended by popular musician Christy Moore. The intended generating capacity of the planned station was therefore required to be sourced from other energy sources, and such, the construction of the coal burning Moneypoint power station began in 1979.

== Fission electricity enters Ireland ==
Following the completion of the HVDC Moyle cable in 2001, connecting Northern Ireland and Scotland, and the larger capacity 500 MW East-West Interconnector in 2012, a submarine cable that connects County Dublin with Wales, Ireland has been supported with electricity from the generation of the Welsh Wylfa fission-electric power station and fission electricity in Britain as a whole. The Wylfa power stations is however shuttered, the last reactor shut down in 2015. Ireland was a net exporter of electricity in 2016 and 2017.

In 2022, environment minister Eamon Ryan said that Ireland was already importing some nuclear-generated electricity through the UK interconnector and would also be connected to France, where nuclear power accounts for a large share of electricity generation.

== Revived interest ==
In April 2006, a government-commissioned report by Forfás pointed to the need for Ireland to reconsider nuclear power in order "to secure its long-run energy security". A relatively small-scale, Generation IV nuclear station was envisaged. In 2007, Ireland's Electricity Supply Board made it known that it would consider a joint venture with a major European Union energy company to build nuclear capacity.

A 2012 International Energy Agency (IEA) report said that Ireland is highly dependent on imported oil and natural/fossil gas. While the push to develop renewable energies is commendable, it will result in an increased reliance on fossil gas, as gas-fired power plants will be required to provide flexibility in electricity supply when wind power is unavailable. About 60% of Ireland's electricity already comes from gas-fired generation, which adds to energy security concerns, particularly as 93% of its gas supplies come from a single transit point in Scotland.

In 2013, the Environmental Protection Agency in Ireland warned that Ireland is not on track to meet its 2020 pollution reductions of greenhouse gases.

In 2014, a Generation IV nuclear station was envisaged in competition with a biomass burning facility as a possible successor to the coal-fired Moneypoint power station.

In 2015 a National Energy Forum was proposed to decide upon generation mixes to be deployed in the Republic of Ireland out to 2030.

In May 2022, then environment minister Eamon Ryan ruled out nuclear power as an option for Ireland's transition away from fossil fuels, saying it would be too expensive and that offshore wind was better suited to the Irish system.

In June 2023, RTÉ reported that the Workers' Party had launched a policy document calling for the immediate introduction of nuclear power in Ireland and proposing six conventional nuclear plants at two or three sites, at an estimated cost of €50 billion. At the launch, party representatives argued that nuclear power was the fastest route to decarbonisation, that a fully renewable grid would not be achieved, and that any Irish nuclear programme should be state-owned and funded through bonds.

The party's policy paper proposed a 30-year programme using established pressurised water reactor designs, with ESB and EirGrid/SONI involved in ownership or operation, and an overseas partner such as EDF or KEPCO providing construction and training support.

In April 2026, former Green Party leader Eamon Ryan wrote in the Irish Times that Ireland's future energy needs should be met by "renewables and nuclear".

In April 2026, Taoiseach Micheál Martin said he was open to nuclear energy in Ireland, but cited cost and construction times as major barriers. Later that month, junior minister Timmy Dooley said there were no plans to introduce nuclear power in Ireland and that the legislative prohibition would first need to be changed.

== Celtic interconnector ==
In 2016 proposals were discussed for the Celtic Interconnector, a 700 MW Irish-French subsea cable linking the electricity grids of Ireland and France. With over 70% of French electricity generated from nuclear power, the interconnector is expected to increase Ireland's access to imported nuclear-generated electricity. Construction began in 2023, and in 2025 RTÉ reported that the project was expected to be operational by the spring of 2028.

== Nuclear fusion ==
As with the other members of the European Atomic Energy Community (Euratom), Ireland funds nuclear fusion energy research, including the International Thermonuclear Experimental Reactor, now known simply as the ITER project, with the Irish contribution being managed by the National Centre for Plasma Science & Technology at Dublin City University.

Irish industry has historically been slow to engage with fusion research, but in 2023 Engineers Ireland. began working with Fusion for Energy. and elected Keelan Keogh as Irelands first Industrial Liaison Officer to promote industrial engagement with fusion research.

== Donegal uranium prospecting ==
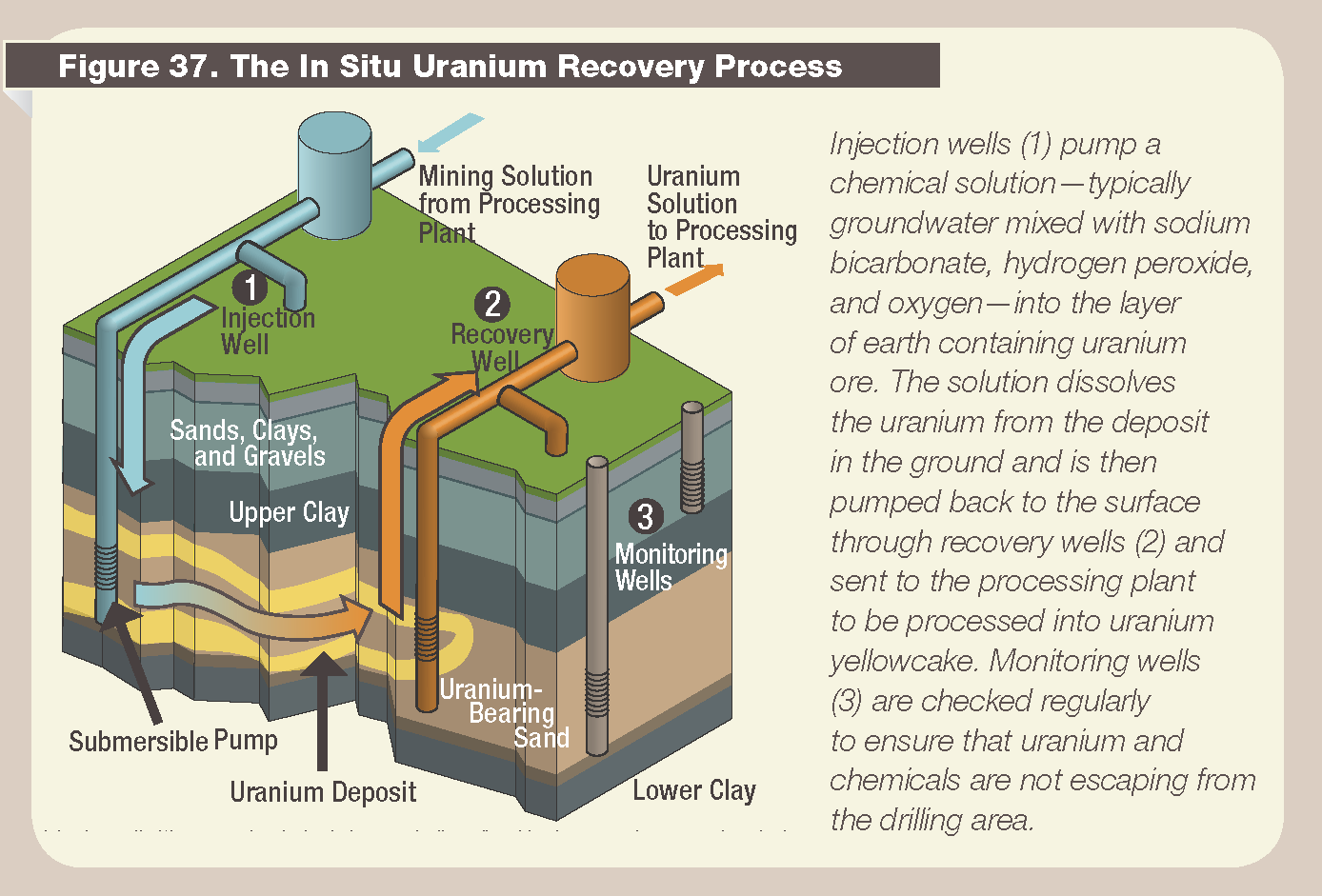
Diagram of solution mining or in-situ leaching for uranium ore (ISL), approximately half of all uranium ore is mined in this way as of 2016. frequently uranium mining is not economical on its own and ISL is primarily conducted on copper ore bodies which bring up uranium ore as a co-product.

In 2007, the Green party which were the political architects behind the 1999 prohibition in the Republic of Ireland of the generation of fission-electricity, further prohibited the granting of exploration contracts to 2 unnamed mineral prospecting companies, which were requesting to explore the west of county Donegal. The then energy minister, the Green party's Eamon Ryan, signaled he was denying the exploration licences as he is "against" nuclear energy. Ryan has also stated that "It would be hypocritical to permit the extraction of uranium for use in nuclear reactors in other countries, while the nuclear generation of electricity is not allowed in Ireland". The suggested mining method of In-situ liquid extraction of underground uranium, was deemed the most likely had the prospecting developed into a mining licence.

Ireland is a member state signatory to the Nuclear Exporters Committee, which requires indigenous exploration and processing companies conduct all uranium-ore extraction and handling. The international committee monitors the exporting of process knowledge and techniques and therefore requires each member state to indigenously develop the processing techniques and manufacture all the equipment that relate to natural uranium ore, within its own borders.

== See also ==
- Radiological Protection Institute of Ireland
- List of power station sites in Ireland
- ISLES project - EU funded Irish-Scottish feasibility project to assess collaboration on Wind and Wave energy projects.
- Spirit of Ireland - a large pumped-storage construction concept, that may be required to supplement Irish wind energy intermittency.
- Fallout (2006 TV series)
- Adi Roche
