= List of shipwrecks in January 1855 =

The list of shipwrecks in January 1855 includes ships sunk, foundered, wrecked, grounded, or otherwise lost during January 1855.

== 1 January ==
List of shipwrecks: 1 January 1855
Ship	State	Description
Brilliant	United Kingdom	The steamship was driven ashore at Berwick upon Tweed, Northumberland. Her passengers were taken off. She was on a voyage from Hull, Yorkshire to Leith, Lothian. She was refloated and taken in to Berwick upon Tweed.
Cycloop	Netherlands	Cycloop The steamship was driven ashore at Zandvoort, North Holland.
Flora	United Kingdom	The brig was wrecked in Algoa Bay. [see also losses on 30 December 1854]
George Canning	United States	The ship was wrecked on Scharhörn/Großer Vogelsand with the loss of all 164 people on board - her crew and 135 passengers. She was on a voyage from Hamburg to New York.
Henry Metcalfe	United Kingdom	The ship ran aground on the Kentish Knock. She was South Shields, County Durham to Constantinople, Ottoman Empire. She was refloated and put in to Ramsgate, Kent in a leaky condition.
J. W. Johnson	United Kingdom	The ship was driven ashore at Passage West, County Cork.
Lady Raffles	United Kingdom	The barque was driven ashore in the Eider. She was refloated on 21 April and taken in to the Guste.
Louise	Duchy of Holstein	The schooner was driven ashore and wrecked on Düne, Heligoland. Her crew were rescued. She was on a voyage from Fredrikstad, Norway to Leith, Lothian, United Kingdom.
Mathilde	Prussia	The schooner was wrecked at "Grurup", Denmark with the loss of three of her eight crew. She was on a voyage from Königsberg to Hull.
Mauve	France	The schooner was driven ashore on "Berkonn Island", Kingdom of Hanover. She was on a voyage from Bayonne, Basses-Pyrénées to Newcastle upon Tyne, Northumberland, United Kingdom.
Maxim	United Kingdom	The barque was wrecked near Hamburg. Her crew were rescued.
Norma	Duchy of Holstein	The ship was driven ashore and wrecked at Hjørring, Denmark. Her crew were rescued. She was on a voyage from London, United Kingdom to Tønning.
Notre Dame du Mount Carmel	France	The ship struck the quayside and sank at Rye, Sussex, United Kingdom with the loss of a crew member. She was refloated and taken in to Rye.
Resolution	United Kingdom	The barque was driven ashore at Old Castle Point, Isle of Wight. She was on a voyage from London to Launceston, Van Diemen's Land.
Stately	United Kingdom	The schooner was wrecked on Neuwerk. Her crew were rescued. She was on a voyage from London to Brake, Kingdom of Hanover.
Vision	United Kingdom	The ship ran aground in the River Mersey. She was on a voyage from Liverpool, Lancashire to Singapore, Straits Settlements. She was refloated and put back to Liverpool.
Zeldenrust	Duchy of Holstein	The schooner capsized in the North Sea off the coast of Denmark with the loss of all hands. She was on a voyage from Greifswald to London.

== 2 January ==
List of shipwrecks: 2 January 1855
Ship	State	Description
Blackheath	United Kingdom	The ship was last sighted in the Atlantic Ocean whilst on a voyage from Calcutta, India to London. No further trace, presumed foundered with the loss of all hands.
HNLMS Cycloop	Royal Netherlands Navy	The paddle steamer was driven ashore near Zandvoort, North Holland with the loss of four of her crew. She was on a voyage from the Baltic Sea to Vlissingen, Zeeland.
Express	United Kingdom	The ship was driven onto the Pwlchwan Flats, off the coast of Pembrokeshire. She was on a voyage from Miramichi, New Brunswick, British North America to Liverpool, Lancashire. She was refloated the next day.
Maxim	United Kingdom	The barque was driven ashore in the Elbe. She was refloated on 23 March and towed in to Glückstadt, Duchy of Holstein.
Pearl	United Kingdom	The brig was driven ashore on Foulney Island, Lancashire. She was on a voyage from Liverpool, Lancashire to Valparaíso, Chile.
Ville de Cette	France	The steamship was driven ashore and wrecked near Philippeville, Algeria. She was on a voyage from Marseille, Bouches-du-Rhône to Philippeville.
Wilhelmine	Prussia	The ship ran aground on Taxfleet Ness, in the Humber. She was on a voyage from Königsberg to Hull, Yorkshire, United Kingdom. She was refloated the next day and taken in to Goole, Yorkshire in a leaky condition.
William Jacobus	United Kingdom	The ship was driven ashore at Flamborough Head, Yorkshire. She was on a voyage from "Frene", France to Leith, Lothian, United Kingdom. She was refloated and put in to Bridlington, Yorkshire.

== 3 January ==
List of shipwrecks: 3 January 1855
Ship	State	Description
Acorn	United States	The full-rigged ship was destroyed by fire at Waldoboro, Maine.
Blackheath	United Kingdom	The ship was sighted on this date whilst on a voyage from Calcutta, India to London. No further trace, presumed foundered with the loss of all hands.
Pearl	United Kingdom	The ship capsized at Newport, Monmouthshire. She was on a voyage from Newport to Liverpool, Lancashire. She was righted.

== 4 January ==
List of shipwrecks: 4 January 1855
Ship	State	Description
Albatross	Duchy of Holstein	The ship was driven ashore at List auf Sylt. Her crew were rescued. She was on a voyage from Neustadt in Holstein to Leith, Lothian, United Kingdom. She became a wreck the next day.
Henry and Margaret	United Kingdom	The ship was in collision with the steamship Imperador (Flag unknown) and sank in Liverpool Bay. Henry and Margaret was on a voyage from Liverpool, Lancashire to Pernambuco, Brazil. She was refloated on 15 January and beached in Bootle Bay before being taken in to Liverpool on 18 January.
HMS Prometheus	Royal Navy	The Alecto-class sloop ran aground in the Melicooree River, African and was damaged.
Sisters	United Kingdom	The ship was driven ashore on Lindisfarne, Northumberland. She was refloated and taken in to Berwick upon Tweed, Northumberland in a leaky condition.
Tvende Sodskende	Denmark	The ship ran aground off Harboøre. She was on a voyage from Aalborg to London, United Kingdom.
Woodman	United Kingdom	The ship was driven ashore on Eniscoo, County Donegal and capsized. She was on a voyage from Sligo to Liverpool.

== 5 January ==
List of shipwrecks: 5 January 1855
Ship	State	Description
Agenoria	United Kingdom	The ship ran aground in the Marabout Channel and was damaged. She was consequently beached. She was on a voyage from Genoa, Kingdom of Sardinia to Alexandria, Egypt. Agenoria was refloated on 15 January.
Diamond	United Kingdom	The steamship was driven ashore and wrecked in Bull Bay, Anglesey. She was on a voyage from Liverpool, Lancashire to Holyhead, Anglesey.
Jane Walton	United Kingdom	The ship was wrecked near "Kierrsadona", Ottoman Empire. Her crew were rescued.
Times	United Kingdom	The ship was .
Ocean Wave	United Kingdom	The ship was driven ashore at Alexandria, Egypt. She was refloated on 7 January.
Times	United Kingdom	The barque was driven ashore at Alexandria. She was refloated on 15 January.
Wellington	United Kingdom	The ship was wrecked on the coast of Liberia.

== 6 January ==
List of shipwrecks: 5 January 1855
Ship	State	Description
Abraham Sarah	United Kingdom	The ship ran aground and was wrecked at the mouth of the Rio Grande. She was on a voyage from the Rio Grande to Liverpool, Lancashire.
Erin's Queen, and Sabrina	United Kingdom	The steamship Erin's Queen was run into by the paddle steamer in the Bristol Channel. Both vessels were beached. Erin's Queen was on a voyage from Belfast, County Antrim to Bristol, Gloucestershire. She was declared a total loss. Sabrina was on a voyage from Bristol to Cork. She was refloated and put back to Bristol.
Henriette	United Kingdom	The ship was driven ashore in the River Mersey. She was on a voyage from Liverpool to Adelaide, South Australia. She was refloated and put back to Liverpool.

== 7 January ==
List of shipwrecks: 6 January 1855
Ship	State	Description
Formosa	United States	The barque was driven ashore at Messina, Sicily. She was on a voyage from Smyrna, Ottoman Empire to Boston, Massachusetts.
Magnific	United Kingdom	The brig ran aground on the Whitby Rock. She was refloated and resumed her voyage.
Willem Jacobus	Netherlands	The ship was driven ashore and severely damaged at Flamborough Head, Yorkshire, United Kingdom. She was refloated.

== 8 January ==
List of shipwrecks: 7 January 1855
Ship	State	Description
Atalanta	United Kingdom	The sloop foundered off the coast of County Antrim with the loss of all four of her crew.
Valkyrien	United Kingdom	The ship sank at Constantinople, Ottoman Empire.

== 9 January ==
List of shipwrecks: 8 January 1855
Ship	State	Description
Lady Sale	United Kingdom	The steamship arrived at Hamburg of fire and was scuttled. She was on a voyage from Hull, Yorkshire to Hamburg. She was refloated on 16 January.

== 10 January ==
List of shipwrecks: 10 January 1855
Ship	State	Description
Corinthian	United Kingdom	The ship was run into by Pacific (United States) and sank at Liverpool, Lancashire. Her crew were rescued. She was refloated on 20 February and taken in to the Prince's Dock, Liverpool.
Primera de Cataluña	Spain	The ship was wrecked on Cayo Verde. All 35 people on board were rescued by HMS Scorpion (Royal Navy). Primera de Catalana was on a voyage from Barcelona to New Orleans, Louisiana, United States.
Railleur	France	The sloop struck the Wolf Rock and sank. Her crew were rescued. She was on a voyage from Bristol, Gloucestershire, United Kingdom to Bordeaux, Gironde.
Thomas and Betsey	United Kingdom	The brig was driven ashore and wrecked at Filey, Yorkshire.

== 11 January ==
List of shipwrecks: 11 January 1855
Ship	State	Description
Hebe	Austrian Empire	The ship was driven ashore near Gallipoli, Ottoman Empire. She was on a voyage from Constantinople, Ottoman Empire to Queenstown, County Cork, United Kingdom. She was later refloated.
Mercury	United Kingdom	The steamship collided with a French barque and was abandoned in a sinking condition off Ouessant, Finistère, France. All on board were rescued by the steamship Arno, the barque Johanna (both United Kingdom) and by Chamborinne (France). Mercury was on a voyage from Bordeaux, Gironde, France to London.
Sir Charles Napier	United Kingdom	The ship departed from Savannah, Georgia, United States for London. No further trace, presumed foundered with the loss of all hands.

== 12 January ==
List of shipwrecks: 12 January 1855
Ship	State	Description
Arnotdale	United Kingdom	The transport ship was wrecked near Gallipoli, Ottoman Empire. Her crew were rescued.
Arrogant	United Kingdom	The ship was lost off the Nicobar Islands. Her crew were rescued. She was on a voyage from Sydney, New South Wales to Moulmein, Burma.
Complete	United Kingdom	The sloop ran aground on the Margate Sand and sank. She was on a voyage from Faversham, Kent to Dunkirk, Nord.
Emily	United Kingdom	The barque was driven ashore at Crosby, Lancashire. She was on a voyage from Liverpool, Lancashire to Pará, Brazil. Emily was refloated and resumed her voyage.
Frances	United Kingdom	The full-rigged ship was driven ashore and wrecked at Joá, Brazil. Her crew were rescued. She was on a voyage from Liverpool to Rio de Janeiro, Brazil.
Mary Hardy	United Kingdom	The ship ran aground on the Spit of the Passage. She was on a voyage from Waterford to Rotterdam, South Holland, Netherlands. She was refloated.
Rufus	United Kingdom	The brig was driven ashore in Gibraltar Bay. She was on a voyage from Garrucha, Spain to Swansea, Glamorgan. She became a wreck on 5 February.
Sappho	United Kingdom	The barque was driven ashore at Waterloo, Merseyside. She was on a voyage from Liverpool to Rio de Janeiro, Brazil. She was refloated and resumed her voyage.

== 13 January ==
List of shipwrecks: 13 January 1855
Ship	State	Description
Celine	United Kingdom	The ship was driven ashore at Petra, Russia. All on board were rescued.
Climax	United Kingdom	The schooner was wrecked on the Long Scar Rocks, on the coast of County Durham. She was on a voyage from Hartlepool, County Durham to King's Lynn, Norfolk.
Holyoak	United States	The ship ran aground on the Tuskar Rock and was holed. She was on a voyage from Saint John, New Brunswick, British North America to Kingstown, County Dublin, United Kingdom. She floated off but came ashore at Carnsore Point, County Wexford.
Tinqua	United States	The extreme clipper ran aground off Cape Hatteras, North Carolina and was wrecked. She was on a voyage from Shanghai, China to New York.

== 14 January ==
List of shipwrecks: 14 January 1855
Ship	State	Description
Amelie	France	The brig was driven ashore at Dundrum, County Down, United Kingdom and was abandoned by all but her captain and mate. She was on a voyage from Bordeaux, Gironde to Glasgow, Renfrewshire, United Kingdom. She was refloated on 23 January and towed in to Belfast, County Antrim by the steamship Belfast (United Kingdom.
Anne	United Kingdom	The brig ran aground at Barber's Point, in the Dardanelles. She was on a voyage from Sunderland, County Durham to Constantinople, Ottoman Empire. She was refloated on 18 January.
Brothers, and Union	United Kingdom	Brothers was in collision with the barque Union and sank. Her crew were rescued by Lord Panmure (United Kingdom). She was on a voyage from Poole, Dorset to Cádiz, Spain. Union also foundered.
Daniel	Belgium	The brig was wrecked at Start Point, Devon, United Kingdom.
Dorcas	United Kingdom	The schooner ran aground on the Haisborough Sands, in the North Sea off the coast of County Durham. She was refloated but found to be sinking and was abandoned. Her crew were rescued by the schooner Ariel (United Kingdom). Dorcas was on a voyage from Hartlepool, County Durham to Teignmouth, Devon.
Elizabeth	United Kingdom	The ship ran aground on the Black Tail, off the north Kent coast. She was refloated on 19 January.
Jessy	United Kingdom	The ship ran aground on the Black Tail. She was refloated on 19 January.

== 15 January ==
List of shipwrecks: 15 January 1855
Ship	State	Description
Ann	United Kingdom	The ship was wrecked at Cape Gabaras, Cape Breton Island, Nova Scotia, British North America with the loss of all hands. She was on a voyage from Boston, Massachusetts, United States to Saint John's, Newfoundland, British North America.
Bisson	France	The ship was wrecked 3 nautical miles (5.6 km) west of Cabo de Santa Maria, Portugal with the loss of eight of her crew. She was on a voyage from Sierra Leone to Marseille, Bouches-du-Rhône.
Chronometer	United States	The schooner was abandoned in the Atlantic Ocean. Her six crew were rescued.
Fanny	United Kingdom	The schooner ran aground on the North Sand, off the coast of Kent and was abandoned. Her crew were rescued by the lugger Ondine (United Kingdom). Fanny was on a voyage from Deptford, Kent to Portsmouth, Hampshire.
Harmonie	United Kingdom	The ship was driven ashore at Hela, Prussia. Her crew were rescued. She was on a voyage from Memel, Prussia to Appledore, Devon. Harmonie was refloated on 3 February and taken in to Danzig.
Livingstone	United Kingdom	The brig was wrecked on the Goodwin Sands, Kent. Her crew were rescued.
Vaduren	Sweden	The schooner was driven ashore and wrecked near "Herrenback", Prussia. She was on a voyage from Stockholm to Hull, Yorkshire, United Kingdom.
Walter Duncan	United Kingdom	The ship departed from Savannah, Georgia, United States for Liverpool, Lancashire. No further trace, presumed foundered in the Atlantic Ocean with the loss of all hands.

== 16 January ==
List of shipwrecks: 16 January 1855
Ship	State	Description
Apollo	Bremen	The ship was driven ashore at Middelkerke, West Flanders, Belgium. She was on a voyage from Havana, Cuba. She was refloated on 19 January.
Eugenie	France	The ship was driven ashore at Lowestoft, Suffolk, United Kingdom. She was on a voyage from Calais to Newcastle upon Tyne, Northumberland, United Kingdom. She was refloated on 19 January.
Fanny	United Kingdom	The schooner was wrecked on the Goodwin Sands, Kent. Her crew were rescued.
Henriette	Bremen	The brig was wrecked on the Kentish Knock. Her crew were rescued on 19 January by a boat sent from the Kentish Knock Lightship ( Trinity House). Henriette was on a voyage from Bremen to St. Jago de Cuba, Cuba.
Julius	Prussia	The ship was in collision with Columbus (United Kingdom) and sank in the Baltic Sea. Her crew were rescued by Columbus. Julius was on a voyage from Memel to Stettin.
Staunton	United Kingdom	The brig ran aground on the Gunfleet Sand, in the North Sea off the coast of Essex. Four crew were rescued two days later by the tug Amazon, the smacks Aurora's Increase and Tryal (all United Kingdom and a "paddle box lifeboat" from HMS Driver (Royal Navy). The lifeboat was lost. Staunton was on a voyage from North Shields, County Durham to London.

== 17 January ==
List of shipwrecks: 17 January 1855
Ship	State	Description
Admiral York	United Kingdom	The schooner was driven ashore at Hartlepool, County Durham. Her crew were rescued. She became a wreck on 22 January.
Aid	United Kingdom	The brig was driven ashore at Middleton, County Durham. Her crew were rescued. She became a wreck on 22 January.
Felicite	France	The ship was wrecked on the Petits Charpontiers, off Saint-Nazaire, Loire-Inférieure. She was on a voyage from Hartlepool to Nantes, Loire-Inférieure.
Pilgrim	United Kingdom	The ship was driven ashore. She was refloated and put in to Larne, County Antrim in a leaky condition.
Swan	United Kingdom	The barque was driven ashore at Crosshaven, County Cork. She was on a voyage from Troon, Ayrshire to Cork. She was refloated the next day.

== 18 January ==
List of shipwrecks: 18 January 1855
Ship	State	Description
Albion	Flag unknown	The barque was severely damaged by fire at Helsingør, Denmark. She was on a voyage from Gävle, Sweden to Algiers, Algeria. The fire was extinguished with assistance from HMS Magicienne (Royal Navy).
Brilliant	United Kingdom	The ship ran aground on the Hook Sand, in the English Channel. She was refloated and put in to Poole, Dorset in a leaky condition.
Ceres	United Kingdom	The ship was damaged by ice and beached at Kalmar, Sweden.
Inconstant	United Kingdom	The ship was abandoned in the Atlantic Ocean off Cabo Frio, Brazil. Her fifteen crew took to two boats; nine crew in one of the boats were rescued, the remainder reported missing; they were subsequently rescued by Nancy (United Kingdom). Inconstant was on a voyage from Callao, Peru to Queenstown, County Cork.
Jane	United Kingdom	The barque was in collision with Elizabeth Rose (United Kingdom) and foundered in the South Atlantic Ocean. Five of her twelve crew were rescued by Elizabeth Rose, the rest were reported missing. Jane was on a voyage from Liverpool, Lancashire to Rio de Janeiro, Brazil.
John	United Kingdom	The brig ran aground off Weymouth, Dorset. She was on a voyage from Newport, Monmouthshire to Southampton, Hampshire.
Maria	United Kingdom	The sloop was abandoned off St. Ives, Cornwall. She was towed in to Padstow.
Mary and Sarah	United Kingdom	The brig ran aground on the Goodwin Sands, Kent. She was on a voyage from South Shields to Bordeaux, Gironde, France. She was refloated and taken in to Ramsgate, Kent in a leaky condition.
Melona	United Kingdom	The ship ran aground on the Herd Sand, in the North Sea off the coast of County Durham. She was on a voyage from London to South Shields, County Durham.
Patmas	United Kingdom	The brig was abandoned in the Atlantic Ocean with the loss of four lives. Survivors were rescued by Mary Black (United Kingdom). Patmas was on a voyage from Sunderland, County Durham to Bordeaux, Gironde.
Thetis	Denmark	The brig was wrecked on the English Bank, in the River Plate.
Woodbine	United Kingdom	The barque ran aground at Cowes, Isle of Wight. She was refloated the next day.

== 19 January ==
List of shipwrecks: 19 January 1855
Ship	State	Description
Elizabeth	(United Kingdom of Great Britain and Ireland) British North America	The brig was driven ashore at Scituate, Massachusetts. Her crew were rescued. Elizabeth was on a voyage from Yarmouth, Nova Scotia to Boston, Massachusetts, United States. She was consequently condemned.
Janet Boyd	United Kingdom	The barque was wrecked on the Margate Sands, off the coast of Kent. Her 26 crew were reported missing, presumed lost. She was on a voyage from Hamburg to London.
Pakenham	United Kingdom	The ship was driven ashore at Cuxhaven. She was on a voyage from Callao, Peru to Dundee, Forfarshire. She floated off and came ashore between "Hubelbank" and "Altenliebe". She was refloated on 29 January and resumed her voyage.
Tigre	United Kingdom	The brig was driven ashore at Barber's Point, in the Dardanelles. She was refloated.

== 20 January ==
List of shipwrecks: 20 January 1855
Ship	State	Description
Devonshire	United Kingdom	The ship ran ashore on the Brake Sand, in the North Sea off the coast of Kent and was abandoned by her ten crew. She floated off the next day and was driven ashore and wrecked at Deal, Kent.
Fanny	United Kingdom	The brigantine was wrecked near St. Jago de Cuba, Cuba. She was on a voyage from New Orleans, Louisiana, United States to Gibraltar.
HMS Perseverance	Royal Navy	The troopship was severely damaged in an accident at Woolwich Dockyard, Kent. She was subsequently repaired and returned to service.
Visurgis	Grand Duchy of Oldenburg	The barque was wrecked on a reef north west of Princes Island, Straits Settlements. All on board were rescued. She was on a voyage from China to London, United Kingdom.

== 21 January ==
List of shipwrecks: 21 January 1855
Ship	State	Description
Carolina Maria	Stralsund	The ship was driven ashore near Varberg, Sweden. She was on a voyage from Stralsund to London, United Kingdom. She was refloated and taken in to Varberg.
Davenport	United Kingdom	The ship was driven ashore at Deal, Kent and was abandoned by her crew. She was on a voyage from South Shields, County Durham to Cowes, Isle of Wight. She was refloated on 5 March and taken in to Ramsgate, Kent.
Henry and Jane	United Kingdom	The schooner was wrecked on the Pye Sand, in the North Sea off the coast of Essex. Her crew were rescued by the smack Providence (United Kingdom). Henry and Jane was on a voyage from Seaham, County Durham to Colchester, Essex.
Reform	United Kingdom	The schooner was driven ashore at Whitstable, Kent. She was on a voyage from London to Plymouth, Devon. She was refloated and taken in to Whitstable.
Terra Nova	United Kingdom	The brig ran aground. She was refloated and put in to Caen, Calvados, France in a sinking condition.
Twey Freunde	Kingdom of Hanover	The ship collided with another vessel and sank in the Swin, off the coast of Essex. Her crew survived. She was on a voyage from Emden to London.
Vittoria	Austrian Empire	The brig ran aground on the Halliday Flats, in the North Sea off the coast of Essex. She was on a voyage from Livorno, Grand Duchy of Tuscany to Newcastle upon Tyne, Northumberland, United Kingdom.

== 22 January ==
List of shipwrecks: 22 January 1855
Ship	State	Description
Abellone	Duchy of Holstein	The ship was in collision with a brig off the Happisburgh Lighthouse, Norfolk, United Kingdom. She subsequently came ashore and was wrecked at Horsey, Norfolk. She was on a voyage from Neustadt in Holstein to London, United Kingdom.
Diana	Netherlands	The schooner was driven ashore at Burnham Overy Staithe, Norfolk, United Kingdom. She was on a voyage from Hartlepool, County Durham, United Kingdom to Constantinople, Ottoman Empire.

== 23 January ==
List of shipwrecks: 23 January 1855
Ship	State	Description
Agnes	United Kingdom	The brig ran aground on the Newcombe Sand, in the North Sea off the coast of Suffolk. She was on a voyage from London to Sunderland, County Durham. She was refloated and taken in to Lowestoft, Suffolk in a leaky condition.
HMS Hecla	Royal Navy	HMS Hecla. The Hydra-class sloop) was driven ashore at Gibraltar. Her crew were rescued. She was refloated on 15 February with assistance from HMS Caesar and HMS Gorgon (both Royal Navy).
Industry	United Kingdom	The schooner was driven ashore at Donna Nook, Lincolnshire.
Lotus	United Kingdom	The barque was destroyed by fire at Demerara, British Guiana.
Resolution	United Kingdom	The brig was driven ashore at Winterton-on-Sea, Norfolk. Her crew were rescued. She was on a voyage from Sunderland, County Durham to Southampton, Hampshire.
Sir John Ogilvy	United Kingdom	The ship was driven ashore and wrecked near Christiansand, Norway. Her crew were rescued. She was on a voyage from Memel, Prussia to Leith, Lothian.
Tiberias	United Kingdom	The brig ran aground on the Bull Sand, in the North Sea off the coast of Lincolnshire. She was refloated with assistance from the Spurn Lifeboat and taken in to Grimsby, Lincolnshire in a leaky condition.

== 24 January ==
List of shipwrecks: 24 January 1855
Ship	State	Description
HMS Bermuda	Royal Navy	The schooner was wrecked in the Caicos Islands. Her crew were rescued.
Maria	United Kingdom	The ship ran aground on Scroby Sands, Norfolk. She was on a voyage from Sunderland, County Durham to London. She was refloated and put in to Lowestoft, Suffolk in a leaky condition.

== 25 January ==
List of shipwrecks: 25 January 1855
Ship	State	Description
Amphitrite	France	The transport ship was lost off the "Isle of Madaline". Her crew were rescued. She was on a voyage from Marseille, Bouches-du-Rhône to the Crimea.
Bebside	United Kingdom	The ship ran aground at Blyth, Northumberland. She was refloated on 18 February and taken in to Blyth in a severely hogged condition.
Fanny	United Kingdom	The ship was in collision with Texel (Netherlands) and foundered in the Mediterranean Sea off "Ivaza Island". Two of her crew got aboard Texel. Fanny was on a voyage from South Shields, County Durham to Genoa, Kingdom of Sardinia.
Niord	Norway	The barque was driven ashore at Selsey, Sussex, United Kingdom. She was refloated on 29 January with the assistance of two tugs and towed in to Portsmouth, Hampshire, United Kingdom.

== 26 January ==
List of shipwrecks: 26 January 1855
Ship	State	Description
Friends	United Kingdom	The ship was driven ashore at Lindisfarne, Northumberland. She was refloated on 30 January and taken in to Lindisfarne. Subsequently towed to Berwick upon Tweed, Northumberland for repairs.
North Esk	United Kingdom	The ship ran aground at Belfast, County Antrim. She was on a voyage from Cardiff, Glamorgan to Belfast. She was refloated on 29 January.
Richard Sadler	Kingdom of Hanover	The schooner was in collision with another vessel and foundered in the English Channel off Dungeness, Kent. Her crew survived.
William Carson	United Kingdom	The barque was wrecked on the Kentish Knock. Her crew survived. She was on a voyage from North Shields, County Durham to Cartagena, Spain and/or Marseille, Bouches-du-Rhône, France.

== 27 January ==
List of shipwrecks: 27 January 1855
Ship	State	Description
Daniel	United Kingdom	The steamship was driven ashore at Hartlepool, County Durham. She was on a voyage from Great Yarmouth, Norfolk to Newcastle upon Tyne, Northumberland. Daniel was refloated and taken in to Hartlepool in a sinking condition.
Henry and Jane	United Kingdom	The schooner was wrecked on the Pye Sand, in the North Sea off the coast of Suffolk. Her crew were rescued the next day by the smack Providence (United Kingdom).
Jane	United Kingdom	The brig was abandoned at sea. Her crew were rescued by the schooner Eter (Spain). Jane was on a voyage from Cardiff, Glamorgan to Malta.
Mary and Sarah	United Kingdom	The ship ran aground on the Goodwin Sands, Kent. She was refloated and taken in to Ramsgate, Kent.
Mary Jane	United Kingdom	The brig was in collision with the barque Georges (France). Two of her crew were rescued by Georges. Mary Ann was on a voyage from Newport, Monmouthshire to Plymouth, Devon. Presumed subsequently foundered.
Stag	United Kingdom	The convict ship ran aground off St Nicholas Island, Devon. She was refloated and taken in to Plymouth, Devon.
William	United States	The ship was driven ashore near Estepona, Spain. She was on a voyage from New York to Gibraltar.
Zwei Freunde	Kingdom of Hanover	The galiot was in collision with a brig and sank in the Swin. Her crew were rescued by the galiot Dido (United Kingdom). Zwei Freunde was on a voyage from Emden to London, United Kingdom.

== 28 January ==
List of shipwrecks: 28 January 1855
Ship	State	Description
Argyle	United Kingdom	During a voyage from Glasgow, Renfrewshire, Scotland, to New York City, United States, the barque was driven ashore and wrecked at Manasquan, New Jersey, United States, in a storm. Sources claim both the loss of all 11 people on board, and that deaths totaled five to 10 people.
Eindragt	Kingdom of Hanover	The ship was wrecked at Grimston, Yorkshire, United Kingdom with the loss of two of her crew. She was on a voyage from Emden to Hull, Yorkshire.
Maria	(United Kingdom of Great Britain and Ireland) Victoria	The ship sprang a leak off King Island Van Diemen's Land and was consequently beached on New Year's Island. She was on a voyage from Portland to Launceston, Van Diemen's Land.
HMS Rosamund	Royal Navy	The steamship was driven ashore at Wells-next-the-Sea, Norfolk. She was on a voyage from Cromarty to HMNB Devonport, Devon. She was refloated.

== 29 January ==
List of shipwrecks: 29 January 1855
Ship	State	Description
Bendigo	United Kingdom	The ship was driven ashore at Caister-on-Sea, Norfolk. She was on a voyage from Køge, Denmark to London.
Juno	France	The schooner was driven ashore and wrecked in the Glénan Islands, Finistère. Her crew were rescued. She was on a voyage from Sunderland, County Durham, United Kingdom to Bordeaux, Gironde.
Ouse	United Kingdom	The Yorkshire Billyboy was driven ashore at Hollesley, Suffolk. She was on a voyage from London to Selby, Yorkshire.
Wybrandus Uno	Netherlands	The ship was driven ashore on the Steenenhoofd. She was on a voyage from Delfzyl, Groningen to Newcastle upon Tyne, Northumberland, United Kingdom and Dutch Guiana.

== 30 January ==
List of shipwrecks: 30 January 1855
Ship	State	Description
British Queen	(United Kingdom of Great Britain and Ireland) Guernsey	The brig struck the Cheval Rock, north of Herm, Channel Islands and foundered. Her crew were rescued. She was on a voyage from Newcastle upon Tyne, Northumberland to Saint-Malo, Ille-et-Vilaine, France.
Gazelle	United Kingdom	The ship was wrecked at "Inaqua" with the loss of her captain. She was on a voyage from St. Jago de Cuba, Cuba to St. John's, Newfoundland, British North America.
Lucy Maria	Netherlands	The full-rigged ship ran aground on the Shipwash Sand, in the North Sea off the coast of Suffolk, United Kingdom. She was on a voyage from Gothenburg, Sweden to Adelaide, South Australia. She was refloated and put in to Harwich, Essex, United Kingdom.
Prince of Wales	United Kingdom	The collier ran aground on the Nore and sank. Her eight crew were rescued by the smack Ripple (United Kingdom). Prince of Wales was on a voyage from South Shields, County Durham to London.
Sanspareil	(United Kingdom of Great Britain and Ireland) South Australia	The ship was driven ashore and wrecked at Cape Jervis.
Stranger	United Kingdom	The brig was wrecked on the Barber Sand, in the North Sea off the coast of Norfolk with the loss of seven of her nine crew. Survivors were rescued by the Caistor and Scratby Lifeboats. She was on a voyage from South Shields to London.
Tramp	United Kingdom	The schooner ran aground and sank at Blyth, Northumberland. Her crew were rescued by the Blyth Lifeboat. She was on a voyage from Thurso, Caithness to London.
Two Sisters	United Kingdom	The ship was driven ashore and wrecked at Wainfleet, Lincolnshire. She was on a voyage from Goole, Yorkshire to London.

== 31 January ==
List of shipwrecks: 31 January 1855
Ship	State	Description
Bombay	United Kingdom	The ship was destroyed by fire in the Atlantic Ocean. Her crew were rescued by Japan (United Kingdom). Bombay was on a voyage from Newry, County Antrim to Savannah, Georgia, United States.
Briton	United Kingdom	The paddle steamer ran aground and was wrecked at Ballantrae, Ayrshire. All on board were rescued. She was on a voyage from Glasgow, Renfrewshire to Stranraer, Wigtownshire.
Carl and Julia	Prussia	The ship ran aground and capsized on the Gunfleet Sand, in the North Sea off the coast of Essex, United Kingdom. Her crew were rescued the next day by the steamship Earl of Aberdeen (United Kingdom). Carl and Julia was on a voyage from Ückermünde to Plymouth, Devon, United Kingdom.
Henry	United Kingdom	The schooner capsized and sank at Newport, Monmouthshire. She was righted but found to be severely damaged.
Le Bon Père	France	The schooner was driven ashore and wrecked near Lamorna, Cornwall, United Kingdom. Her crew were rescued. She was on a voyage from Havre de Grâce, Seine-Inférieure to Newcastle upon Tyne, Northumberland, United Kingdom.
Liberty	United Kingdom	The sloop was wrecked at Sand Point, Somerset. Her crew survived.
Monarch	United Kingdom	The ship ran aground at Portsmouth, Hampshire. She was on a voyage from Guernsey, Channel Islands to Hartlepool, County Durham. She was refloated.
RMS Tyne	United Kingdom	The steamship ran aground on the Red Sand, off the north Kent coast. She was refloated the next day and put back to the River Thames.

== Unknown date ==
List of shipwrecks: Unknown date in January 1855
Ship	State	Description
Andes	United Kingdom	The ship ran aground on the Little Burbo Bank, in Liverpool Bay. She was on a voyage from Liverpool, Lancashire to Malta. She was refloated on 16 January and resumed her voyage.
Aspasia	United Kingdom	The brig was destroyed by fire in the Atlantic Ocean. Her crew were rescued. She was on a voyage from New York to Liverpool.
Bombay	India	The ship was driven ashore and severely damaged in Chincha Bay before 18 January. She was on a voyage from Hong Kong to Amoy, China. She was refloated and taken in to Amoy for repairs.
Caradoc	United Kingdom	The ship was driven ashore on the coast of Le Portel, Pas-de-Calais, France. She was on a voyage from Limerick to London. She was refloated on 31 January.
Celt	United Kingdom	The ship was wrecked at Cape Sandal, on the coast of the Black Sea. She was on a voyage from the Crimea to Constantinople, Ottoman Empire.
Circassian	United Kingdom	The ship was lost off Chebogue, Nova Scotia, British North America before 12 January.
Erinis Queen	United Kingdom	The ship was in collision with Sabrina (United Kingdom) and sank in the Bristol Channel.
Eveline	United Kingdom	The transport ship was wrecked before 18 January.
Garden City	United States	The steamboat was destroyed by fire in the Arkansas River.
Hollander	United Kingdom	The brig was wrecked on Saint Domingo before 22 January. She was on a voyage from Saint Domingo to Liverpool.
Howling Wind	United Kingdom	The barque was abandoned in the Atlantic Ocean after 18 January. All on board were rescued by a New York pilot boat. She was on a voyage from Philadelphia, Pennsylvania, United States to Londonderry.
Lauwerzee	Netherlands	The ship was presumed to have foundered in the English Channel after 11 January. She was on a voyage from Newcastle upon Tyne, Northumberland, United Kingdom to Nickerie, Dutch Guiana. A headboard from the ship washed up at Dover, Kent, United Kingdom on 6 February.
Maid of Kent	United Kingdom	The schooner was abandoned in the North Sea before 7 January. Her nine crew were rescuced by Eliza (United Kingdom). Maid of Kent was taken in to Terschelling, Friesland, Netherlands in a derelict condition on 20 January.
Nancy Treat	United States	The barque was abandoned in the Atlantic Ocean off the Bahamas. Her crew were rescued by Paquet (Spain). She was on a voyage from Cárdenas, Cuba to Cork and/or Cowes, Isle of Wight, United Kingdom.
Panama	United Kingdom	The barque was wrecked on a reef in the Atlantic Ocean off Maceió, Brazil before 26 January. Her crew were rescued. She was on a voyage from Callao, Peru to Rio de Janeiro and Cork.
Pearl	United States	The paddle steamer suffered a boiler explosion and sank at the mouth of the American River in late January with the loss of more than 70 lives.
Rose	United Kingdom	The schooner foundered in the Swin, off the coast of Essex. She was later refloated and taken in to Harwich, Essex with the assistance of some smacks.
Tingqua	China	The ship foundered off Cape Hatteras, North Carolina, United States on or about 19 January.
Two Friends	United Kingdom	The ship sank. She was refloated on 1 February and taken in to Gravesend, Kent.
Witch of the Wave	United Kingdom	The ship was abandoned in the Atlantic Ocean before 31 January. She was on a voyage from Saint John, New Brunswick, British North America to Liverpool.
