= Aquilone =

Aquilone may refer to:

- Flavio Aquilone (b.1990), Italian voice actor
- Italian destroyer Aquilone, more than one Italian naval ship
