= Valentina Favazza =

Italian voice actress (born 1987)

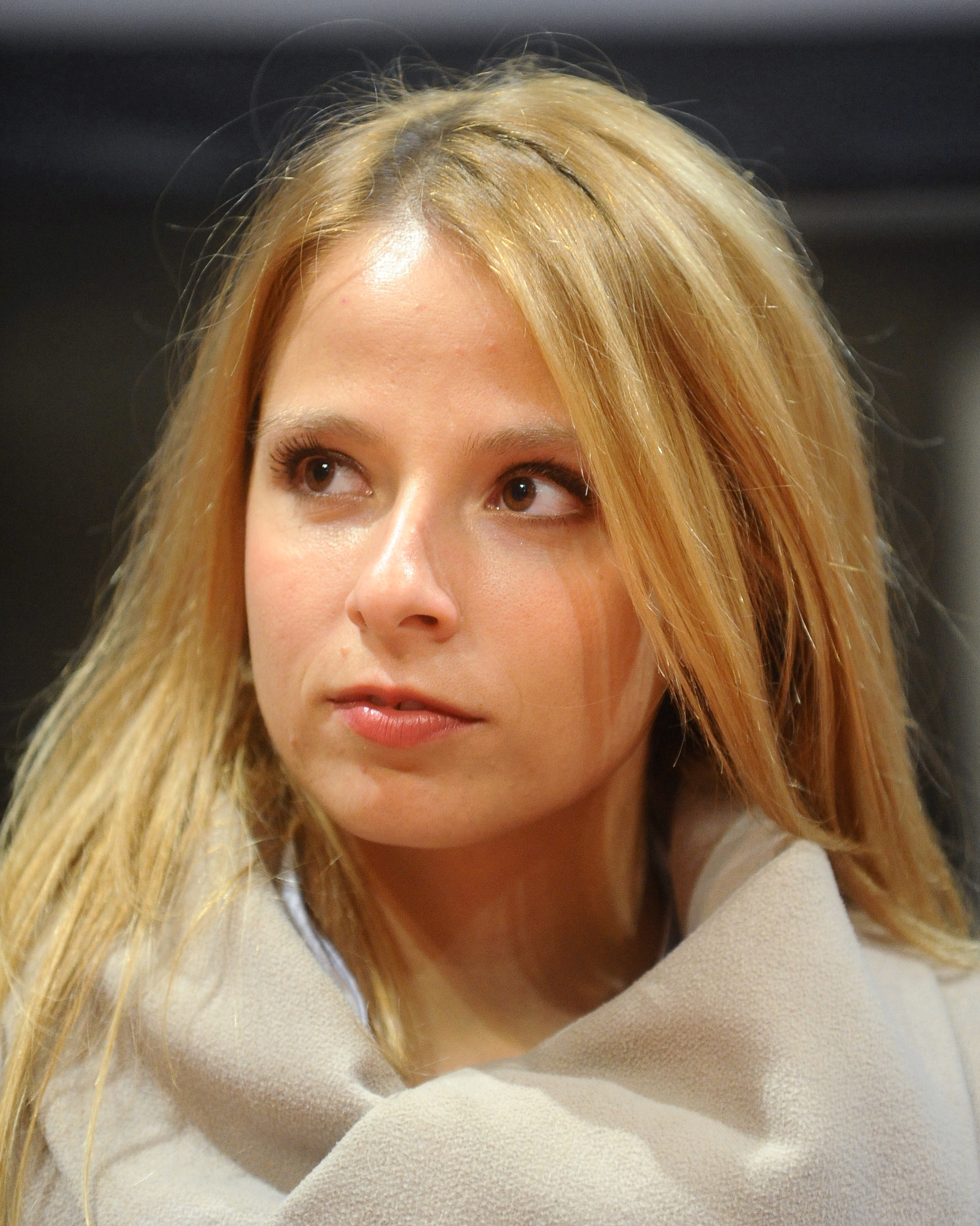
- Favazza attending the Lucca Comics & Games convention in 2015
- Born: 10 October 1987 (age 38); Aosta, Italy
- Occupation: Voice actress
- Years active: 2005–present
- Children: 1

Valentina Favazza (born 10 October 1987) is an Italian voice actress.

== Biography ==
Born in Aosta, Favazza has been active in the Italian dubbing industry since 2005. At the age of seven, Favazza would often listen to the Italian dialogue in international films, which is what inspired her to become a voice dubber. She is best known for having voiced Jyn Erso in the Italian dub of Rogue One: A Star Wars Story as well as dubbing Daisy Johnson in Agents of S.H.I.E.L.D.. Some of the actresses she is known for dubbing includes Felicity Jones, Alicia Vikander, Shailene Woodley, Chloe Bennet, Lily Collins and Jennifer Lawrence. In 2015 she participated in the "Oscar Marathon" organized by Vanity Fair and Sky.

In 2016, she received the Leggio d'oro award for her performance in dubbing over Alicia Vikander's characters in The Danish Girl and Suffragette.

=== Personal life ===
On 19 September 2019, Favazza gave birth to a son, Enea, through her relationship with voice actor Flavio Aquilone.

== Dubbing roles ==
=== Animation ===
- Glim in Mune: Guardian of the Moon
- Mary Jane Watson in Ultimate Spider-Man
- Jyn Erso in Star Wars Forces of Destiny
- Jamie in The Amazing World of Gumball (Season 1)
- Shelly in A Turtle's Tale: Sammy's Adventures
- Agnes in Fantastic Mr. Fox
- Kiki in Robinson Crusoe
- Greta in Ferdinand
- Virginia in Lola & Virginia
- Garnet & Alexandrite in Steven Universe
- Sasha Braus in Attack on Titan
- Lila Rossi in Miraculous: Tales of Ladybug & Cat Noir
- Queen Rapsheeba in ChalkZone
- Yoko Littner in Gurren Lagann
- Miki Aono/Cure Berry in Fresh Pretty Cure!
- Princess Peach in The Super Mario Bros. Movie
- Lute in Hazbin Hotel
- Suzuha Amane in Steins;Gate, Steins;Gate 0

=== Live action ===
- Santa Paws in The Search for Santa Paws
- Santa Paws' son in Santa Buddies
- Jyn Erso in Rogue One: A Star Wars Story
- Daisy Johnson in Agents of S.H.I.E.L.D.
- Rosie Dunne in Love, Rosie
- Mystique in X-Men: First Class, X-Men: Days of Future Past, X-Men: Apocalypse
- Sophie in We Are Your Friends
- Anna in Chloe
- Kalique Abrasax in Jupiter Ascending
- Alice Deane in Seventh Son
- Eva in StreetDance 2
- Barb Howard in Fallout
- Alisha Khanna in The Office
