= List of shipwrecks in December 1854 =

The list of shipwrecks in December 1854 includes ships sunk, foundered, wrecked, grounded, or otherwise lost during December 1854.

== 1 December ==
List of shipwrecks: 1 December 1854
Ship	State	Description
Esperance	United Kingdom	The schooner was driven ashore at "Rotbol", Denmark. She was on a voyage from Hartlepool, County Durham to Marstrand, Sweden.
Framat	Sweden	The ship sprang a leak in the North Sea and was abandoned. Her crew were rescued by Dorothea (Flag unknown). Framat was on a voyage from London, United Kingdom to Karlskrona.
Margery	United Kingdom	The schooner was wrecked off Skagen, Denmark. Her crew were rescued. She was on a voyage from Newcastle upon Tyne, Northumberland to Uddevalla, Sweden.
Susan	United States	The trading schooner was lost near Old House Cove, Gloucester, Massachusetts. Crew saved.

== 2 December ==
List of shipwrecks: 2 December 1854
Ship	State	Description
Annie	(United Kingdom of Great Britain and Ireland) British North America	The barque was wrecked at Placentia, Newfoundland. Her crew were rescued.
Esperance	United Kingdom	The schooner was driven ashore at Rotvoll, Norway. Her crew were rescued. She was on a voyage from Hartlepool, County Durham to Marstrand, Sweden.
Maria	Kingdom of Hanover	The ship was wrecked on Langeoog. Her crew were rescued She was on a voyage from Hooksiel to London, United Kingdom.

== 3 December ==
List of shipwrecks: 3 December 1854
Ship	State	Description
Alphonsus Maria	Netherlands	The ship ran aground on the Hornum Sand, in the North Sea. She was refloated but ran aground on the Knupsand. Her crew were rescued. She was on a voyage from Groningen to London, United Kingdom.
Silesia	United Kingdom	The brig was lost in the Strait of Belleisle. Her crew were rescued.

== 4 December ==
List of shipwrecks: 4 December 1854
Ship	State	Description
Brecknells	United Kingdom	The ship was wrecked on the Barra de Tutoya, off Paraíba, Brazil. Her crew were rescued.
Celina	(United Kingdom of Great Britain and Ireland) British North America	The schooner was wrecked in Tratacayostique Bay. Her crew were rescued. She was on a voyage from Quebec City to Blanc-Sablon, Province of Canada.
Columbia	United Kingdom	The ship was driven ashore on Terschelling, Friesland, Netherlands. She was on a voyage from Kertch, Russia to Hull, Yorkshire.
Hannah and Margaret	United Kingdom	The ship was wrecked at Whitby, Yorkshire. Her crew were rescued.
Hendrika	Netherlands	The barque was wrecked on the Banjaard Sand, in the North Sea off the Dutch coast with the loss of all 82 people on board. She was on a voyage from Rotterdam, South Holland to Batavia, Netherlands East Indies.
Holderness	United Kingdom	The ship was driven ashore at Zandvoort, North Holland, Netherlands. She was on a voyage from Newcastle upon Tyne, Northumberland to Rotterdam. She had become a wreck by 9 December.
Rovigno	Trieste	The ship ran aground on the Haisborough Sands, in the North Sea off the coast of Norfolk, United Kingdom. She was refloated but consequently sank with the loss of sixteen lives. She was on a voyage from Falmouth, Cornwall, to Hull, Yorkshire, United Kingdom.
Sisters	United Kingdom	The ship was driven onto a reef off Buctouche, New Brunswick, British North America and wrecked.

== 5 December ==
List of shipwrecks: 5 December 1854
Ship	State	Description
A-là-Mode	United Kingdom	The brigantine was driven ashore at Catalina, Newfoundland, British North America.
Erin's Queen	United Kingdom	The steamship was driven ashore on Oyster Island, County Sligo. She was on a voyage from Sligo to London.
Flora	Kingdom of Hanover	The ship ran aground off Neuwark. Her crew were rescued. She was on a voyage from Bremen to Hamburg.
Isabella	Sweden	The schooner ran aground on the Hunderplatte, in the Eider. She was on a voyage from Cette, Hérault, France to Hamburg.
Lizio	Portugal	The ship was abandoned in the Atlantic Ocean. Her crew were rescued by Henry Pratt (United States). Lizio was on a voyage from Bahia, Brazil to Lisbon.
Mary Carson	United Kingdom	The ship collided with Baron de Bruck (Flag unknown) and ran aground at Liverpool. She was refloated.
Nancy	United Kingdom	The schooner was in collision with another vessel and the ran aground at Dundalk, County Louth. She was on a voyage from Donaghadee, County Down to Liverpool.
Palmyra	(United Kingdom of Great Britain and Ireland) British North America	The ship was wrecked on a reef 15 nautical miles (28 km) west of Saint Thomas, Virgin Islands. She was on a voyage from Saint Thomas to the Rio de la Hacha.
Pilot, or Violet	United Kingdom	The brig was driven ashore at Kirkcudbright. She was on a voyage from Glasgow, Renfrewshire to a Mediterranean port.
Shetland	United Kingdom	The ship was wrecked at Whitby, Yorkshire. Her crew were rescued.

== 6 December ==
List of shipwrecks: 6 December 1854
Ship	State	Description
Gratitude	United Kingdom	The ship was abandoned off Ramsey, Isle of Man. Her crew were rescued by the steamship Prince of Wales (United Kingdom). Gratitude was on a voyage from Dundalk, County Louth to Glasgow, Renfrewshire. She was towed in to Ramsey on 7 December by Princess Alice (United Kingdom).
James	United Kingdom	The brig was driven ashore at the Little Ross Lighthouse, Wigtownshire. She was on a voyage from Bahia, Brazil to Glasgow.

== 7 December ==
List of shipwrecks: 7 December 1854
Ship	State	Description
Carmelo	Trieste	The ship was wrecked on the Holm Sand, in the North Sea off the coast of Suffolk, United Kingdom. Her crew were rescued. She was on a voyage from Hull, Yorkshire to Trieste.
Cognac Packet	United Kingdom	The ship ran aground on the Lemon and Ower Sand, in the North Sea. She was on a voyage from Harwich, Essex to Hartlepool, County Durham. She was refloated with the assistance of a smack and assisted in to Great Yarmouth, Norfolk.
Driver	United Kingdom	The clipper ran aground at Liverpool, Lancashire. She was refloated and taken in to the River Mersey.
Georges	France	The brig ran aground and sank at Margate, Kent, United Kingdom. She was on a voyage from L'Aiguillon-sur-Mer, Vendée to London, United Kingdom.
Gipsy	United States	The steamboat was destroyed by fire at New Orleans, Louisiana with the loss of several lives.
Josephine	United Kingdom	The ship departed from Saint John's, Newfoundland, British North America for the Clyde. No further trace, presumed foundered with the loss of all hands.
London	United Kingdom	The barque was wrecked at Burnham Overy Staithe, Norfolk with the loss of fourteen of the 38 people on board. She was on a voyage from the River Tyne to Penang, Malaya.
Margaret Littlejohn	United Kingdom	The brig was driven ashore at Hartlepool. She was on a voyage from Seaham, County Durham to Dundee, Forfarshire.
Royal William	United Kingdom	The ship was driven ashore at Cagliari, Sardinia. She was on a voyage from Malta to Swansea, Glamorgan.
Tooting	United Kingdom	The ship was wrecked at Little Lorraine, Newfoundland, British North America. Her crew survived. She was on a voyage from Charlottetown, Prince Edward Island, British North America to Liverpool.
Wear Packet	United Kingdom	The snow was driven ashore at Wells-next-the-Sea, Norfolk. Her crew were rescued by the tug Economy (United Kingdom) and a boat.

== 8 December ==
List of shipwrecks: 8 December 1854
Ship	State	Description
Columbo	(United Kingdom of Great Britain and Ireland) British North America	The ship ran aground 9 nautical miles (17 km) off Barmouth, Merionethshire.
Cyrene	United States	The schooner capsized and caught fire in the Atlantic Ocean off Stratford, Connecticut due to her cargo of quicklime getting wet. Her crew were rescued by the steamship Decateur (United States). Cyrene was on a voyage from Providence, Rhode Island to Norwich, Connecticut.
Halifax	(United Kingdom of Great Britain and Ireland) British North America	The brig was driven ashore and wrecked at "Port Ontario".
Island Queen	United States	The schooner was driven ashore at Sodus, New York. She was on a voyage from Oswego to Ogdensburg, New York.
John	United Kingdom	The ship was driven ashore at Great Yarmouth, Norfolk. She was on a voyage from Hartlepool, County Durham to Chatham, Kent. She was refloated and taken in to Great Yarmouth in a leaky condition.
Lewis Cass	United States	The schooner was driven ashore at Conneaut, Ohio. Her seven crew were rescued by a lifeboat.
Oliver	Bremen	The schooner ran aground off the north coast of Heligoland. Her crew were rescued. She was on a voyage from Newcastle upon Tyne, Northumberland, United Kingdom to Vegesack.
Pomona	United States	The barque was wrecked. Her crew took to the yawl and landed on Grenadier Island, New York.

== 9 December ==
List of shipwrecks: 9 December 1854
Ship	State	Description
Lady of the Lake	United Kingdom	The ship was driven ashore at Point St. Denis, Province of Canada, British North America. She was on a voyage from Quebec City, Province of Canada to Greenock, Renfrewshire.
Pearl	United Kingdom	The ship was driven ashore at Kamouraska, Province of Canada. She was on a voyage from Quebec City to Combwich, Somerset or Falmouth, Cornwall.
Telegraph	United Kingdom	The schooner was driven ashore on Sylt, Duchy of Holstein. She was on a voyage from Hull, Yorkshire to Uddevalla, Sweden. She was refloated the next day and taken in to Sylt.
Thomas and Betsey	United Kingdom	The ship was driven ashore at Speeton, Yorkshire. Her crew were rescued. She was on a voyage from London to Sunderland, County Durham. She was refloated on 2 March 1855 and sailed for the Humber.
Triton	United Kingdom	The abandoned full-rigged ship was driven ashore and wrecked on Saint Pierre Island.
Vesta	Rostock	The ship was driven ashore and sank at Tostenæs, Denmark. Her crew were rescued. She was on a voyage from an English port to Rostock.

== 10 December ==
List of shipwrecks: 10 December 1854
Ship	State	Description
Hero	United States	The barque was abandoned in the Atlantic Ocean. Her crew were rescued by Virginia (United States).
Joven Dolores	United Kingdom	The barque was driven ashore east of Blueberg Beach, Cape Colony. She was on a voyage from Melbourne, Victoria to Mauritius and London. She was refloated the next day.
Parthian	United Kingdom	The ship ran aground at Sunderland, County Durham. She was refloated and towed in to Sunderland.

== 11 December ==
List of shipwrecks: 11 December 1854
Ship	State	Description
Caroline Matilde	Lübeck	The schooner was wrecked at Ystad, Sweden. She was on a voyage from Ystad to Lübeck.
Pride of the Sea	United Kingdom	The ship was driven ashore and destroyed by fire at Pwllheli, Caernarfonshire.

== 12 December ==
List of shipwrecks: 12 December 1854
Ship	State	Description
Ann and Elizabeth	United Kingdom	The sloop capsized and was driven ashore at Harwich, Essex. She was on a voyage from London to Hull, Yorkshire. She was refloated and taken in to Harwich.
Clarinda	United Kingdom	The ship ran aground on the Anholt Reef, in the Baltic Sea. She was on a voyage from Stettin to Hull. She was refloated on 17 December and put in to Helsingør, Denmark in a leaky condition.
John Horrocks	United Kingdom	The ship was driven ashore at the Point of Ayr, Cheshire. She was on a voyage from Liverpool, Lancashire to Demerara, British Guiana.
Pachietto di Trieste	Trieste	The ship departed from London for Newcastle upon Tyne, Northumberland, United Kingdom. She was sighted off Great Yarmouth, Norfolk a few days later. No further trace, presumed foundered in the North Sea with the loss of all hands.
Queen of the Sea	United Kingdom	The ship was driven ashore and sank near Swansea, Glamorgan. She was on a voyage from Liverpool to Swansea.
Ranger	United Kingdom	The ship was driven ashore and sank at Redcar, Yorkshire. Her crew survived. She was on a voyage from Sandwich, Kent to Middlesbrough, Yorkshire.
Recovery	United Kingdom	The ship was driven ashore and sank at Redcar. Her crew survived. She was on a voyage from Rochester, Kent to Middlesbrough.

== 13 December ==
List of shipwrecks: 13 December 1854
Ship	State	Description
Flirt	United Kingdom	The brig was driven ashore in Camusnagall Bay, Inverness-shire. She was on a voyage from Dahomey to Liverpool, Lancashire.
Lord Raglan	United Kingdom	The ship ran aground on Kangaroo Island, South Australia. She was on a voyage from Adelaide, South Australia to Calcutta, India. She was refloated on 4 February and resumed her voyage.
Perseverance	United Kingdom	The sloop sprang a leak and sank in the North Sea off Whitburn, County Durham. Her crew were rescued. She was on a voyage from Largs, Ayrshire to Portsmouth, Hampshire.
Princess Victoria	United Kingdom	The ship ran aground on the Old Harry Ledge, in the English Channel. She was on a voyage from South Shields, County Durham to Exeter, Devon. She was refloated and put in to Poole, Dorset in a leaky condition.
Waldron	(United Kingdom of Great Britain and Ireland) British North America	The ship was wrecked on Watlings Island. Her crew were rescued. She was on a voyage from Port-au-Prince, Haiti to New York, United States.
Wupper	Netherlands	The ship ran aground on the Schielhoek, in the North Sea of the coast of Zeeland. She was on a voyage from Hull, Yorkshire, United Kingdom to Rotterdam, South Holland.

== 14 December ==
List of shipwrecks: 14 December 1854
Ship	State	Description
HNLMS Amsterdam	Royal Netherlands Navy	The man-of-war ran aground off the Kullen Lighthouse, Sweden. She was refloated with the assistance of HNLMS Cycloop (Royal Netherlands Navy) and Magicienne (Royal Navy).
Christina Hendrika	Netherlands	The ship departed from Pillau, Prussia for Amsterdam, North Holland. No further trace, presumed foundered with the loss of all hands.
Perseverance	(United Kingdom of Great Britain and Ireland) British North America	The ship was wrecked on the coast of Labrador. Her crew were rescued.
Spes	United Kingdom	The barque was driven ashore near Gourock, Renfrewshire. She was on a voyage from Liverpool, Lancashire to Greenock, Renfrewshire. She was refloated and taken in to Greenock.

== 15 December ==
List of shipwrecks: 15 December 1854
Ship	State	Description
Astrea	Sweden	The barque was wrecked on a reef 12 nautical miles (22 km) north of Maceió, Brazil. She was on a voyage from Callao, Peru to Queenstown, County Cork, United Kingdom.
Commercial	United Kingdom	The ship was driven ashore at Dungeness, Kent. She was on a voyage from Newcastle upon Tyne, Northumberland to Dieppe, Seine-Inférieure, France. She was refloated and put in to Dover, Kent.
Queen of the West	United States	The full-rigged ship was driven ashore and wrecked at Laugharne, Carmarthenshire, United Kingdom. Her 144 passengers were rescued, the crew initially remaining aboard but subsequently also being rescued. She was on a voyage from New York to Liverpool, Lancashire, United Kingdom. Queen of the West was refloated on 19 January 1855 and towed in to Llanelly, Glamorgan.
Scott Dyer	United Kingdom	The ship was driven ashore in the River Tigre, Brazil.
Topsy	United Kingdom	The schooner ran aground on the Oaze Edge, off the north Kent coast. She was refloated.

== 16 December ==
List of shipwrecks: 16 December 1854
Ship	State	Description
Aletta Charlotta	Netherlands	The galiot was wrecked near Aberffraw, Anglesey, United Kingdom. She was on a voyage from "Requijada" to Liverpool, Lancashire, United Kingdom.
Duke of York	United Kingdom	The barque struck the North and South Rock, in the Irish Sea and was holed. She was abandoned the next day off the Isle of Man Six crew in the pinnace were rescued on 18 December by a fishing boat. Nine crew in the gig were reported missing. Duke of York was on a voyage from Rothesay Bay to the Bay of Bengal.
Isabella	United Kingdom	The ship foundered in the Atlantic Ocean. Her crew survived.

== 17 December ==
List of shipwrecks: 17 December 1854
Ship	State	Description
Agno	United Kingdom	The ship was wrecked on the Whitby Rock. Her crew were rescued by the Whitby Lifeboat.
Liverne	United Kingdom	The steamship ran aground in Karatch Bay, in the Crimea.

== 18 December ==
List of shipwrecks: 18 December 1854
Ship	State	Description
Brothers	United Kingdom	The schooner was driven into the barque Liberty and Property (United Kingdom) and sank at Great Yarmouth, Norfolk. Her crew were rescued by Liberty and Property. Brothers was on a voyage from Arbroath, Forfarshire to London.
Devonia	United Kingdom	The barque was wrecked on the Goodwin Sands, Kent with the loss of four of her seventeen crew. Survivors were rescued by Lord Warden and Princess Helena (both United Kingdom). Devonia was on a voyage from South Shields, County Durham to "Aquilas", Spain. She subsequently floated off and came ashore 2 nautical miles (3.7 km) north of Boulogne, Pas-de-Calais, France.
Isabel	United Kingdom	The ship was abandoned off Cuba. Her crew survived. She was on a voyage from Saint Domingo to Liverpool, Lancashire.
Lerminy	France	The ship was wrecked on Sal, Cape Verde Islands. Her crew were rescued. She was on a voyage from the Gambia River to Marseille, Bouches-du-Rhône.
Livorno	United Kingdom	The steamship was wrecked in the Kamiesch. Her crew were rescued.
Rose	United Kingdom	The ship foundered in the Swin, off the coast of Essex. She was on a voyage from Scotland to London. She had been refloated by 3 January 1855 and taken in to Harwich, Essex.
Shepherd	United Kingdom	The schooner was wrecked or foundered with the loss of all four crew. She was on a voyage from Ballina, County Mayo to Liverpool.

== 19 December ==
List of shipwrecks: 19 December 1854
Ship	State	Description
Anne Marie	France	The bomb vessel was wrecked at Dellys, Algeria. Her crew were rescued.
Concord	United Kingdom	The ship was wrecked at St. Ives, Cornwall with the loss of her captain. She was on a voyage from Newport, Monmouthshire to Southampton, Hampshire.
Martingale	United Kingdom	The ship was driven ashore at Cromer, Norfolk.
Navy	United Kingdom	The ship was driven ashore at Flamborough Head, Yorkshire. She was on a voyage from Hull, Yorkshire to Sunderland, County Durham. She was refloated and taken in to Bridlington, Yorkshire.
St. Patrick	United Kingdom	The ship was driven ashore and wrecked at Barnegat, New Jersey, United States. All on board - her crew and 411 passengers, were rescued.
Swift	United Kingdom	The schooner was wrecked at St. Ives. Her crew were rescued. She was on a voyage from Newport to Sheerness, Kent. She was refloated on 10 September 1855 and taken in to St. Ives, where she sank.

== 20 December ==
List of shipwrecks: 20 December 1854
Ship	State	Description
Ane Karensminde	Netherlands	The ship departed from Texel, North Holland for Leith, Lothian, United Kingdom. No further trace, presumed foundered with the loss of all hands.
Bride of Abydos	United Kingdom	The snow was driven ashore and wrecked on the Ballyranock Reef, off the coast of County Kerry. Her crew were rescued. She was on a voyage from Limerick to London.
Concord	United Kingdom	The sloop was wrecked at St. Ives, Cornwall. Her crew were rescued.
Helios	United Kingdom	The ship was driven ashore at Tranmere, Cheshire. She was on a voyage from Liverpool, Lancashire to New Orleans, Louisiana, United States. She was refloated.
Jean Brut	France	The brig was in collision with British Queen (United Kingdom) and foundered in the Mediterranean Sea off Cape de Gatt, Spain. Her crew were rescued by British Queen.
Petilla	United Kingdom	The schooner was driven ashore at Le Havre, Seine-Inférieure, France. She was on a voyage from Sunderland, County Durham, to Le Croisic, Loire-Inférieure, France. She had been refloated by 30 January and taken in to Le Havre for repaires.
Sister Ann	United Kingdom	The brig was driven ashore and wrecked at Bangor, County Down with the loss of five of her seven crew. She was on a voyage from Ayr to Belfast, County Antrim.
Swift	United Kingdom	The sloop was wrecked at St. Ives. Her crew were rescued.
Willem Jan	Netherlands	The ship departed from Hellevoetsluis, Zeeland for Sunderland. No further trace, presumed foundered with the loss of all hands.

== 21 December ==
List of shipwrecks: 21 December 1854
Ship	State	Description
Adelaide and Victoria	United Kingdom	The derelict schooner was driven ashore at Wallasey, Cheshire.
Lavinia and Mary	United Kingdom	The ship ran aground on the West Rocks, in the North Sea off the coast of Essex. She was on a voyage from the Humber to London. She was refloated.
Looshtank	(United Kingdom of Great Britain and Ireland) British North America	The ship was driven ashore at Burnham-on-Sea, Somerset. She was on a voyage from Quebec City, Province of Canada to Bridgwater, Somerset.
Louisa	United Kingdom	The schooner was driven ashore and wrecked near Pembrey, Carmarthenshire. She was on a voyage from Bremen to Liverpool, Lancashire.
Marchioness of Clydesdale	United Kingdom	The ship was driven ashore and wrecked near Killybegs, County Donegal. Her eighteen crew were rescued by some fishermen.
Tynwald	(United Kingdom of Great Britain and Ireland) Isle of Man	The paddle steamer struck steps at the Prince's Pier, Liverpool when departing for Douglas, severely damaging her starboard paddle box. The sailing was cancelled and she was placed under repair.

== 22 December ==
List of shipwrecks: 22 December 1854
Ship	State	Description
Coin	United Kingdom	The ship was in collision with Henry Benness (United Kingdom) and sank in the North Sea. Her crew were rescued. She was on a voyage from Sunderland, County Durham, to London.
Gesina	(flag) Kingdom of Hanover	The galiot collided with a brig and foundered in the North Sea 16 nautical miles (30 km) off Lowestoft, Suffolk, United Kingdom. Her crew were rescued.
Kate	United Kingdom	The barque was driven ashore at Troon, Ayrshire. She was on a voyage from Quebec City, Province of Canada, British North America to Greenock, Renfrewshire.
Lady Franklin	United Kingdom	The ship ran aground on the Diamond Reef, in the East River. She was on a voyage from Liverpool, Lancashire to New York, United States.
London and Scarborough	United Kingdom	The ship was driven ashore and wrecked at Wainfleet, Lincolnshire. Her crew were rescued. She was on a voyage from Hartlepool, County Durham to Boston, Lincolnshire.
Orion	United Kingdom	The ship departed from Cagliari, Sardinia for Hull, Yorkshire. No further trace, presumed foundered with the loss of all hands.
Sirius	United Kingdom	The ship was driven ashore and damaged on the Kent coast. She was on a voyage from Southampton, Hampshire to South Shields, County Durham. She was refloated and resumed her voyage in a leaky condition, having taken on extra hands.

== 23 December ==
List of shipwrecks: 23 December 1854
Ship	State	Description
Anna	Prussia	The ship was damaged by ice at Pillau.
Carolus	Prussia	The ship was damaged by ice at Pillau.
Cito	Prussia	The ship was crushed by ice and sank at Pillau.
Concordia	United Kingdom	The ship was driven ashore by ice at Pillau.
Diana	Imperial Russian Navy	Diana. 1854 Tōkai earthquake: The Speshnyi-class frigate sank at Miyajima-mura, Japan. Her crew built the schooner Heda (Imperial Russian Navy) from the remains of Diana with the help of the Japanese.
Enigkeit	Prussia	The ship was crushed by ice and sank at Pillau.
Eleanor	United Kingdom	The brig sprang a leak and was beached on the Gunfleet Sand, in the North Sea off the coast of Essex. She was on a voyage from Sunderland, County Durham, to Whitstable, Kent. She was refloated on 25 December and taken in to Harwich, Essex.
Elise	Prussia	The ship was damaged by ice at Pillau.
Ellen	Prussia	The ship was damaged by ice at Pillau.
Fides	Prussia	The ship was damaged by ice at Pillau.
Freuz	Prussia	The ship was damaged by ice at Pillau.
Henriette	Prussia	The ship was damaged by ice at Pillau.
Hercules	Prussia	The ship was damaged by ice at Pillau.
Hylke	Netherlands	The galiot was driven against the breakwater and damaged at Tarragona, Spain.
Iris	Prussia	The ship was damaged by ice at Pillau.
Johanna	Prussia	The ship was damaged by ice at Pillau.
Maria Anna	Prussia	The ship was damaged by ice at Pillau.
Marianne	Prussia	The ship was damaged by ice at Pillau.
Mary Ann Henderson	United Kingdom	The ship was abandoned in the North Sea. Her crew were rescued by Jane (United Kingdom). Mary Ann Henderson was on a voyage from Königsberg, Prussia to London.
Nova	United Kingdom	The schooner was abandoned in the North Sea off Filey, Yorkshire. She was on a voyage from Dundee, Forfarshire to London. She was taken in to Filey on 25 December by some fishermen.
Reditd	Prussia	The ship was damaged by ice at Pillau.
Sophie	Prussia	The ship was damaged by ice at Pillau.
Windshaut	Prussia	The ship was damaged by ice at Pillau.

== 24 December ==
List of shipwrecks: 24 December 1854
Ship	State	Description
SS Arabia	United Kingdom	The troopship was run aground Punta del Faro, Sicily. She was on a voyage from Marseille, Bouches-du-Rhône, France to the Crimea. She was refloated and resumed her voyage.
Honor	Spain	The brig ran aground on the Helwick Sands. She was refloated and towed in to Swansea, Glamorgan, United Kingdom by Troubadour (United Kingdom).
Hendrik Jorgenson	Denmark	The galiot was driven ashore and wrecked on Bornholm. She was on a voyage from Copenhagen to Rügenwalde, Prussia.
Loyal Standard	United Kingdom	The ship was driven ashore. She was refloated and towed in to Scarborough, Yorkshire.
Prince Albert	United Kingdom	The ship was driven ashore at Cagliari, Sardinia. She was on a voyage from Malta to an English port. She was later refloated.
Thetis	United Kingdom	The brig was run down and sunk in the River Thames by the steamship Pioneer (United Kingdom). The wreck was dispersed by explosives in April 1855.

== 25 December ==
List of shipwrecks: 25 December 1854
Ship	State	Description
Anne	United Kingdom	The ship foundered in the North Sea. Her crew were rescued.
Bolivar	United Kingdom	The barque was driven ashore west of Broughty Ferry, Forfarshire.
Dorothy, and Malta	United Kingdom	The snow Dorothy collided with the brig Malta and sank in the North Sea off Happisburgh, Norfolk. her crew were rescued by the brig Planet (United Kingdom). Malta was abandoned by her crew, who were also rescued by Planet. Malta was subsequently discovered 20 nautical miles (37 km) north west of Cromer, Norfolk by Ivanhoe (United Kingdom). She was towed in to Great Yarmouth, Norfolk.
Echo	United Kingdom	The schooner was driven ashore and wrecked at Dymchurch, Kent. She was on a voyage from London to the Isles of Scilly.
Forrester	United Kingdom	The schooner was driven ashore and wrecked on "Sultha", Orkney Islands. Her crew were rescued.
Gipsy Queen	United Kingdom	The ship was wrecked on the Fish Keys. She was on a voyage from St. Jago de Cuba, Cuba to Swansea, Glamorgan.
Marshal	United Kingdom	The schooner was driven ashore and wrecked on Flotta, Orkney Islands. Her crew were rescued. She was on a voyage from the River Spey to Stromness, Orkney Islands.
Sea Breeze	United Kingdom	The ship ran aground at South Shields, County Durham. She was on a voyage from the River Tyne to Constantinople, Ottoman Empire.

== 26 December ==
List of shipwrecks: 26 December 1854
Ship	State	Description
Czar	United Kingdom	The ship ran aground on the Scroby Sands, Norfolk. She was refloated and put in to Great Yarmouth, Norfolk.
Florida	United Kingdom	The barque ran aground on the Scotstown Reef, off the coast of Aberdeenshire. She was on a voyage from Callao, Peru to Cromarty. She was refloated and taken in to Peterhead, Aberdeenshire.
Forrester	United Kingdom	The schooner was driven ashore and wrecked on Swona, Orkney Islands.
Lulan	United Kingdom	The barque was wrecked on "Santa Arma Island", off Maranhão, Brazil with the loss of a crew member. She was on a voyage from Liverpool, Lancashire to Maranhão.

== 27 December ==
List of shipwrecks: 27 December 1854
Ship	State	Description
David	Sweden	The brig was wrecked on "Swartboden". Her crew were rescued. She was on a voyage from Umeå to London, United Kingdom.
Hempsyke	United Kingdom	The transport ship was destroyed by fire at Constantinople, Ottoman Empire.
Prince of the Seas	United Kingdom	The ship struck the Corsair Rock, off Point Nepean, Victoria and was consequently beached off Point King. All on board were rescued. She was on a voyage from the Clyde to Melbourne, Victoria. She was refloated on 31 January 1855 and beached near Williamstown, Victoria.

== 28 December ==
List of shipwrecks: 28 December 1854
Ship	State	Description
Blakeney Trader	United Kingdom	The ship was driven ashore at Wells-next-the-Sea, Norfolk. She was refloated and taken in to Wells-next-the-Sea in a severely leaky condition.
Forester	United Kingdom	The schooner was wrecked at Stromness, Orkney Islands.
Friends	United Kingdom	The ship was driven ashore and wrecked at Lindisfarne, Northumberland. She was on a voyage from Charlestown, Cornwall to Middlesbrough, Yorkshire.
Protector	United Kingdom	The ship was driven ashore, wrecked and burnt in the Bay of Bagnell, Haiti. Her crew were rescued. She was on a voyage from Trinidad to Aux Cayes, Haiti.
Rebecca	United Kingdom	The ship ran aground on the Girdler Sand, in the Thames Estuary. She was on a voyage from London to Seville, Spain. She was refloated and taken in to Ramsgate, Kent in a leaky condition.
Ocean Breeze	United Kingdom	The ship ran aground at Newcastle upon Tyne, Northumberland. She was on a voyage from Newcastle upon Tyne to Constantinople, Ottoman Empire. She was refloated and resumed her voyage.

== 29 December ==
List of shipwrecks: 29 December 1854
Ship	State	Description
Lydia	Kingdom of Hanover	The ship was driven ashore near Rønne, Denmark. Her crew were rescued. She was on a voyage from Memel, Prussia to the Firth of Forth.
Norreys	United Kingdom	The brig was driven ashore at Flamborough Head, Yorkshire. She was refloated and resumed her voyage.

== 30 December ==
List of shipwrecks: 30 December 1854
Ship	State	Description
Clara Luisa	United Kingdom	The ship ran aground on the English Bank, in the River Plate and was damaged. She was on a voyage from Liverpool, Lancashire to Montevideo, Uruguay. She was refloated and taken in to Montevideo.
Flora	United Kingdom	The barque was driven ashore and wrecked in Algoa Bay. [see also losses on 1 January 1855]
Hero	United Kingdom	The ship was in collision with Ann (United Kingdom) in the North Sea off the coast of Northumberland and was abandoned. Her crew were rescued by Ann. Hero was subsequently taken in to Lindisfarne, Northumberland.

== 31 December ==
List of shipwrecks: 31 December 1854
Ship	State	Description
Ariel	United Kingdom	The schooner was run down and sunk at Greenock, Renfrewshire by the clipper Greenock (United Kingdom). Her crew were rescued.
Felim Jacob	France	The ship sprang a leak and was beached at Flamborough Head, Yorkshire, United Kingdom. She was refloated the next day and taken in to Bridlington, Yorkshire.
Flora	United Kingdom	The schooner was driven ashore in Loch Indaal. She was on a voyage from Liverpool, Lancashire to Westport, County Mayo. She was refloated on 2 January 1855 and taken in to Coultersay.
Living Age	United States	The clipper was wrecked on the Pratas Shoal. She was on a voyage from Shanghai, China to New York.
Nathaniel Hooper	United States	The ship sprang a leak and was abandoned in the Atlantic Ocean. Her sixteen crew were rescued the next day by Samuel Dunnings (United States). Nathaniel Hooper was on a voyage from St. Ubes, Portugal to Baltimore, Maryland.

== Unknown date ==
List of shipwrecks: Unknown date in December 1854
Ship	State	Description
HNLMS Amsterdam	Royal Netherlands Navy	The man-of-war foundered after 14 December.
Aquetnet	United Kingdom	The ship was run ashore at Montijo, Portugal before 12 December. She was on a voyage from Valparaíso, Chile to London.
Carleton	(United Kingdom of Great Britain and Ireland) British North America	The brig was wrecked at Tangiers, Nova Scotia.
Colon	United Kingdom	The brig was abandoned in the Atlantic Ocean off Cape Finisterre, Spain before 11 December.
Culloden	United Kingdom	The ship was driven ashore.
Dunorwick	United Kingdom	The sloop foundered in the Irish Sea after 19 December with the loss of all three crew. She was on a voyage from Dunfanaghy, County Donegal to Liverpool Lancashire.
Eliza	France	The ship was wrecked off Honfleur, Manche between 17 and 19 December.
Fetkeller	(United Kingdom of Great Britain and Ireland) British North America	The ship was wrecked in the Grand Banks of Newfoundland. Her crew were rescued by Orbit (United Kingdom).
Flora	United Kingdom	The ship was driven ashore and wrecked in Larne Bay. She was on a voyage from Málaga, Spain to Glasgow, Renfrewshire.
Frances Nesham	United Kingdom	The ship departed from Mahón, Spain for Marseille, Bouches-du-Rhône, France. No further trace, presumed foundered in the Mediterranean Sea with the loss of all hands.
Gazelle	United Kingdom	The brig was abandoned in the Atlantic Ocean before 9 December.
Georgiana	United Kingdom	The schooner was driven ashore at Barber's Point, in the Dardanelles before 25 December.
Giovane Innocente	France	The transport ship was wrecked in the Sea of Marmora off Büyükçekmece, Ottoman Empire.
Hibernia	United Kingdom	The ship was driven ashore near Indian River. She was on a voyage from Philadelphia, Pennsylvania, United States to Liverpool, Lancashire.
Isabella Anderson	United Kingdom	The ship departed from Leith, Lothian in early December. No further trace, presumed foundered with the loss of all hands.
Lotus	(United Kingdom of Great Britain and Ireland) British North America	The brig was wrecked at St. George's, Newfoundland.
Margaret Malcolm	United Kingdom	The ship was in collision with the schooner Mariner (United Kingdom) and sank in the River Thames at Woolwich, Kent. She was on a voyage from Peterhead, Aberdeenshire to London.
Pampero	(United Kingdom of Great Britain and Ireland) British North America	The full-rigged ship was abandoned in the Atlantic Ocean before 21 December.
Sunnyside	United Kingdom	The ship was wrecked on the Bahama Banks. She was on a voyage from New Orleans, Louisiana, United States to Liverpool.
Walburton	United Kingdom	The ship was wrecked off Ynys Llanddwyn, Anglesey. She was on a voyage from Seville, Spain to Liverpool, Lancashire.
Westmoreland		The ship foundered near the Manitou islands on Lake Michigan with the loss of 17 lives and $50,000 of property.
