= Flavio Aquilone =

Italian voice actor (born 1990)

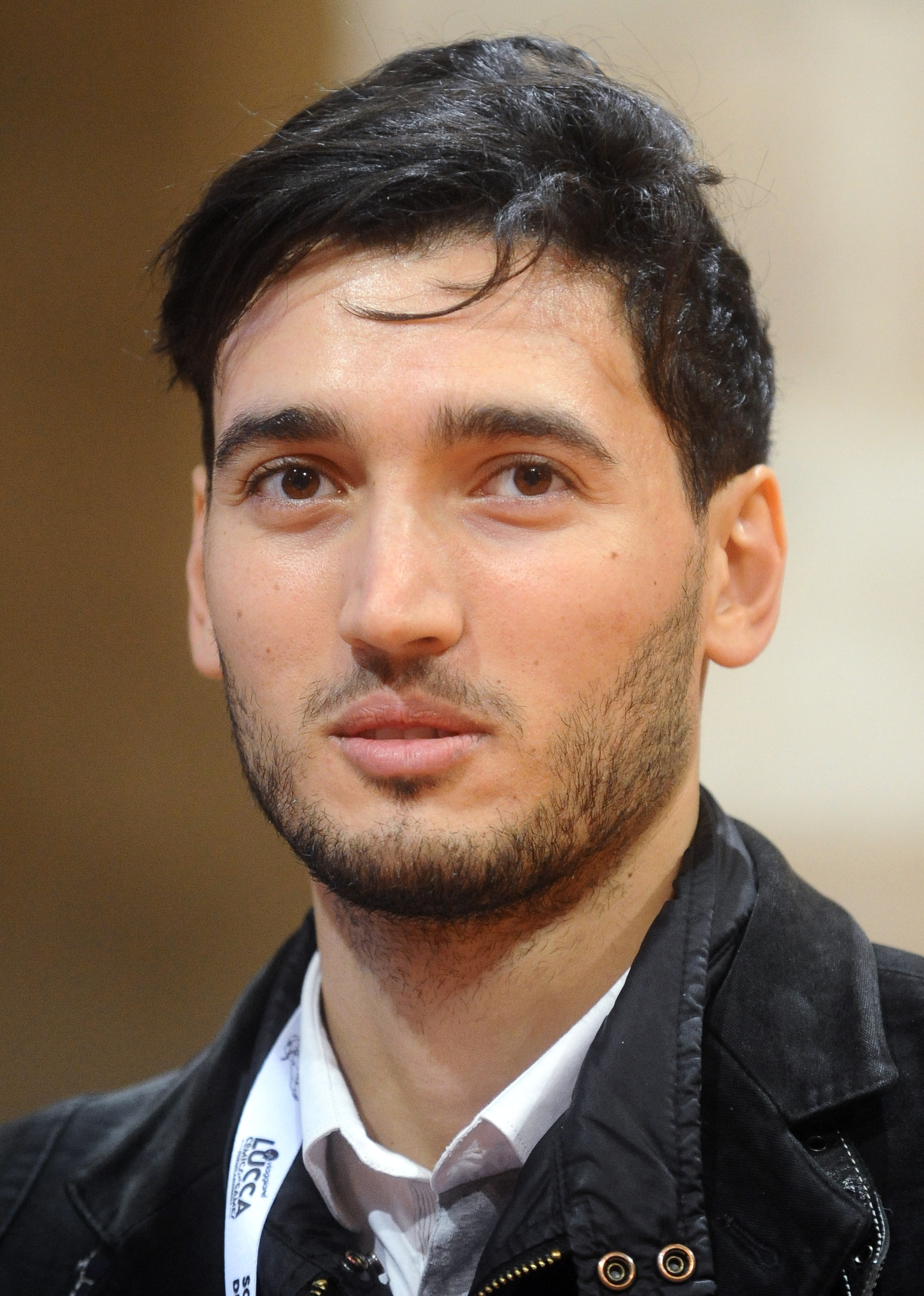
- Aquilone attending the Lucca Comics & Games convention in 2015
- Born: 21 February 1990 (age 36); Rome, Italy
- Occupation: Voice actor
- Years active: 1994–present
- Children: 1
- Relatives: Novella Marcucci (mother)

Flavio Aquilone (born 21 February 1990) is an Italian voice actor.

== Biography ==
Born in Rome to dialogue adapter and dubbing director Novella Marcucci, Aquilone made his voice acting debut at the age of four. He has provided the Italian dubbing voice of Tom Felton since his role as Draco Malfoy in the Harry Potter franchise, and Zac Efron's; other actors Aquilone has dubbed includes Rami Malek, Liam Hemsworth, Anton Yelchin, Devon Bostick, Dane DeHaan, Daryl Sabara in his role as Juni Cortez in the Spy Kids franchise, and many others. His character dubbing roles include Chase Matthews in Zoey 101.

Concerning animation, Aquilone voiced Light Yagami in the Italian dub of Death Note and Hiccup from the How to Train Your Dragon franchise.

=== Personal life ===
Aquilone is in a relationship with voice actress Valentina Favazza. On September 19, 2019, they had a son, Enea.

== Voice work ==
=== Animation ===
- Spike Tinklemeister in Chi ha paura?...
- Zufi in I Lunes e la sfera di Lasifer
- Benny in I magicanti e i tre elementi
- Brent in Spike Team

=== Dubbing roles ===
==== Animation ====
- Hiccup in How to Train Your Dragon, How to Train Your Dragon 2, How to Train Your Dragon: The Hidden World, DreamWorks Dragons
- John, Micky, and Terry in Humanoid Monster Bem
- George Little in Stuart Little 3: Call of the Wild
- Kludd in Legend of the Guardians: The Owls of Ga'Hoole
- Scott in Total Drama
- Leonard Helperman in Teacher's Pet
- Arthur Pendragon in Shrek the Third
- Cody Maverick in Surf's Up
- Fugo in Sword of the Stranger
- Otto Osworth in Time Squad
- Nova in Ultimate Spider-Man
- Jimmy Neutron in Jimmy Neutron: Boy Genius
- Jamie in The Amazing World of Gumball (2nd voice)
- Adrien Agreste in Miraculous: Tales of Ladybug & Cat Noir
- Brad Buttowski in Kick Buttowski: Suburban Daredevil
- Light Yagami in Death Note
- Louis in Beastars
- Jean Kirschtein in Attack on Titan
- Dominic Sorel in Eureka Seven
- Snap in Oh Yeah! Cartoons
- Armand Roulin in Loving Vincent
- Shawn Froste in Inazuma Eleven
- Ultraman in Ultraman: Rising
- Brad Boimler in Star Trek: Lower Decks
- Xavier Olivette in Mobile Suit Gundam GQuuuuuuX
- Stolas in Helluva Boss
- Essek Thelyss in The Mighty Nein

==== Live action ====
- Draco Malfoy in Harry Potter and the Philosopher's Stone, Harry Potter and the Chamber of Secrets, Harry Potter and the Prisoner of Azkaban, Harry Potter and the Goblet of Fire, Harry Potter and the Order of the Phoenix, Harry Potter and the Half-Blood Prince, Harry Potter and the Deathly Hallows – Part 1, Harry Potter and the Deathly Hallows – Part 2
- Troy Bolton in High School Musical, High School Musical 2, High School Musical 3: Senior Year
- Juni Cortez in Spy Kids, Spy Kids 2: The Island of Lost Dreams, Spy Kids 3-D: Game Over, Spy Kids: All the Time in the World
- Rodrick Heffley in Diary of a Wimpy Kid, Diary of a Wimpy Kid: Rodrick Rules, Diary of a Wimpy Kid: Dog Days
- Gale Hawthorne in The Hunger Games, The Hunger Games: Catching Fire, The Hunger Games: Mockingjay – Part 1, The Hunger Games: Mockingjay – Part 2
- Peter Pevensie in The Chronicles of Narnia: The Lion, the Witch and the Wardrobe, The Chronicles of Narnia: Prince Caspian, The Chronicles of Narnia: The Voyage of the Dawn Treader
- Patrick McCardle in The Derby Stallion
- Teen Mike O'Donnell in 17 Again
- Charlie St. Cloud in Charlie St. Cloud
- Paul in New Year's Eve
- Jason in That Awkward Moment
- Cole Carter in We Are Your Friends
- Jason Kelly in Dirty Grandpa
- Dave Stangle in Mike and Dave Need Wedding Dates
- Matt Brody in Baywatch
- Phillip Carlyle in The Greatest Showman
- Cameron Bale in Summerland
- Dodge Landon in Rise of the Planet of the Apes
- Patrick in The Apparition
- James Ashford in Belle
- Lucius Tyco Ennius in Risen
- Jackson Michaels in A Time for Dancing
- Zack Mazursky in Alpha Dog
- Kyle Reese in Terminator Salvation
- Porter Black in The Beaver
- Charley Brewster in Fright Night
- Ian in Only Lovers Left Alive
- Milton Schultz in Dying of the Light
- Andrew Detmer in Chronicle
- Cricket Pate in Lawless
- Lockhart in A Cure for Wellness
- Lucien Carr in Kill Your Darlings
- Chris Morgan in Devil's Knot
- Harry Osborn in The Amazing Spider-Man 2
- Zach Orfman in Life After Beth
- James Dean in Life
- Jamal Malik in Slumdog Millionaire
- Julio in Machete
- Chase Matthews in Zoey 101
- Finn Hudson in Glee
- Kendall Knight in Big Time Rush
- Zeke Falcone in Zeke and Luther
- Woody Fink in The Suite Life on Deck
- Curtis in The Santa Clause 2, The Santa Clause 3: The Escape Clause
- Ben Geller in Friends
- Tyler James in Dog with a Blog
- Chris in Everybody Hates Chris
- Michael Hobbs in Elf
- Jason Stickler in Cory in the House
- Andres Calixto in Violetta
- Nat Wolff in "Body Cam"
- Dathan in Star Wars: The Rise of Skywalker
- Thaddeus in Fallout
- Ivo López Pérez Beltrán in Gli Incorreggibili

=== Video games ===
- Nova in Disney Infinity 2.0
