= Spirit of Ireland =

Alternative energy proposal

Spirit of Ireland is a proposal to build pumped-storage hydroelectricity reservoirs in valleys in Ireland's west coast combined with large-scale on-shore and off-shore windfarms to reduce Ireland's dependence on imported energy and fossil fuels. It would initially involve identifying up to five coastal valleys from counties Donegal to Cork, building dams on their seaward side and flooding them with sea water. These would provide a hydro-power back-up for the wind farms. The proposal has been likened to the construction of the Ardnacrusha hydroelectric power scheme, which was Ireland's first large post-independence infrastructure project and required investment equivalent to 25% of the national budget at the time but met the majority of the state's electricity needs for 50 years.

The project came about when the two founders of the Pumped Hydro Electric Company (Dermot McDonald and Mark Wheeler) met Igor Shvets, a physics professor at Trinity College Dublin and Graham O'Donnell. McDonnell and Wheeler were promoting large scale seawater Pumped Storage as a solution to some of Ireland's electricity balancing and storage issues while Shvets was proposing energy independence for Ireland in his 2008 talk entitled The Energy Options for Ireland. Following the talk local engineers, scientists and businesspeople including Orbiscom co-founder Graham O'Donnell formed a foundation to further study the idea.

Typically, wind farms only produce 25 to 35 per cent of their maximum possible electricity output when measured over a long period. The proposed hydro-generating stations would come into play when wind speeds were either too low or too high to be useful. Each of the reservoirs would be able store up to 100 gigawatt-hours of hydro energy.

Under the Spirit of Ireland proposals, a very typical natural valley water reservoir would have a dammed lake area when full of 4 square Km – e.g. average 2 km x 2 km. Based on studied shapes, depths and height from the sea etc., two such reservoirs would deliver some 200 GWh of electrical energy. A third reservoir would increase this to 300 GWh. This is a considerable energy store and in fact there are many valleys studied which would give considerably larger storage. 30 potential locations have been considered by engineers involved in the project.

The long-term strategy is to develop higher capacity electrical interconnectors with continental Europe which would allow export of excess generating capacity whilst allowing for the import of electricity in the event of sustained no wind conditions. This scenario would be expected to be very infrequent and during such times the reservoirs would be filled using imported electricity at off peak times which would command much lower prices. Locations for the pumped storage reservoirs have not yet been decided but are expected to be located in areas that are otherwise economically deprived which would help to fulfil the Irish goal of balanced regional development.

In 2013, Statoil was approached as part of a €1.5bn first round funding drive for the project, but declined to participate. The scheme has failed to find further investors and several of the engineers involved have halted design work on the project until investment can be found. Additional electrical interconnector projects like the Celtic Interconnector between Ireland and France are progressing with Irish government funding and European Investment Bank support, these high capacity interconnectors with the rest of the European supergrid may make the project more viable in the future.

== See also ==
- Turlough Hill
- Electricity sector in Ireland
- Okinawa Yanbaru Seawater Pumped Storage Power Station
