= Environmental Protection Agency (Ireland) =

Irish governmental organisation

- An Ghníomhaireacht um Chaomhnú Comhshaoil

State agency overview
- Formed: 1993
- Jurisdiction: Ireland
- Headquarters: Johnstown Castle, Wexford, Y35 W821, Ireland; 52.295915°N 6.501418°W
- Employees: 350+
- Annual budget: €72.85 million (2018)
- State agency executive: Laura Burke, (Director General)
- Website: www.epa.ie

The Environmental Protection Agency (EPA) is responsible for protecting and improving the environment as a valuable asset for the people of Ireland. It operates independently under the Department of Climate, Energy and the Environment.

== History ==
The EPA was founded in 1993, following the enactment of the Environmental Protection Agency Act 1992. In 2014, it merged with the Radiological Protection Institute of Ireland, which was itself founded in 1992. The present-day EPA continues the activities of both groups.

== Organisation ==
The EPA operates independently under the Department of Climate, Energy and the Environment. It is led by an advisory committee headed by a director general. The current director general, Laura Burke, was appointed in 2011.

=== Offices ===
There are five offices which answer to the advisory committee.

- The Office of Environmental Enforcement is responsible for implementing and enforcing environmental legislation.
- The Office of Environmental Sustainability is responsible for advocating for environmental protection and sustainability, with a goal in particular to meet Ireland's multiple environmental commitments.
- The Office of Evidence and Assessment is responsible for providing environmental data, information and assessment.
- The Office of Radiation Protection and Environmental Monitoring - responsible for ensuring that the public is protected from the effects of harmful ionizing radiation.
- The Office of Communications and Corporate Services - responsible for providing support for all staff across the EPA.

=== Sites ===
The EPA operates from a number of sites across Ireland. The Headquarters are located in Johnstown Castle Estate, County Wexford.

Additional offices are located in:

- Dublin
- Inniscarra, County Cork
- Castlebar, County Mayo
- Monaghan
- Kilkenny
- Athlone, County Westmeath
- Limerick

== See also ==
- Conservation biology
- Ecology
- Environmental protection
- Habitat conservation
- Natural environment
- Natural capital
- Natural resource
- Renewable resource
- Sustainable development
- Sustainability
