= Nuclear Energy Board =

Defunct Irish nuclear power agency

Agency logo

The Nuclear Energy Board (officially titled An Bord Fuinnimh Núicléigh) was an Irish agency charged with developing nuclear power in Ireland. It was established in Ireland on 30 November 1973 by the Nuclear Energy (An Bord Fuinnimh Núicléigh) Act 1971.

The board was responsible in the 1970s for pursuing the policy of developing a nuclear power station, which was to be located at Carnsore Point, County Wexford. This policy ultimately failed and the board gradually faded from public attention, eventually concentrating on nuclear-related environmental reports. It was not a large organisation, with the Electricity Supply Board doing most operational work.

== Nuclear power ==
=== Planning ===
In 1968, Ireland's economic development required more energy production and the Electricity Supply Board began evaluating ways of diversifying its electricity generation. The Turlough Hill project had just commenced and this was one of the most prestigious engineering projects since the foundation of the state and the Shannon hydroelectric scheme. In the 1970s the need for new energy sources became more urgent, especially after the 1973 energy crisis. In 1975 Bord Gáis was established in order to develop Kinsale gas field, slowing the nuclear energy project as it was hoped it may be an alternative. However, in 1974 planning permission was sought for four reactors with County Wexford County Council, with one to be built immediately, most likely of pressurized water reactor design.

=== Uncertainty ===
The economic slowdown of 1974 and 1975 saw the project temporarily put on hold. When Desmond O'Malley became the new Minister for Industry, Commerce and Energy in 1977 the project once again became a priority of government policy. This time the government wanted to build a 650 MW plant at Carnsore at a cost of £350 million (Punt) at then-prices. In 1979 the project was again postponed, following a change in government when George Colley became the new minister in charge of the project and the incident at Three Mile Island in the United States. Friends of the Earth and other groups lobbied against the plan and in 1981 the Electricity Supply Board and the government announced it was no longer national policy.

=== Cancellation ===
Ultimately the board was remembered for the plans put on and off hold, and resulting immense controversy. Also there was criticism that the government overestimated the need of energy in Ireland in the future; at one point it was estimated that industry would consume 57% of energy by 1990 - internationally this is rather large, as 40% is a typical value. Nevertheless, Ireland in the 1970s was regarded as being in a dangerous position on energy, as 75% of needs were met by oil, and European Economic Community policy was to reduce this below 50% by 1985, after two energy crises.

== Aftermath ==
After 1981 the Nuclear Energy Board was not immediately abolished, instead rather than becoming nuclear advocate, with the board became redefined in a new role as an environmentalist. The board sponsored a number of reports, in particular on the Sellafield plant which has long been a source of dispute between Ireland and the United Kingdom.

On 1 April 1992 the successor to the board was established, the Radiological Protection Institute of Ireland. The production of electricity for supply to the national grid, by nuclear fission, is currently prohibited under the Electricity Regulation Act 1999 (Section 18).
