= Orbiscom =

Orbiscom Limited
- Company type: Private
- Industry: Financial services
- Founded: 1999 in Dublin, Ireland
- Founders: Graham O'Donnell; Ian Flitcroft
- Defunct: 2009-01-05
- Fate: Acquired on January 5, 2009
- Headquarters: Dublin, Ireland
- Owners: HgCapital
- Number of employees: 50 (2009)

Orbiscom was an electronic payments company based in Dublin, Ireland. Orbiscom developed Controlled Payment Number technology to generate transaction-unique numbers for credit cards, preventing fraud by masking the original card number. The company was founded in 1999 by Graham O'Donnell and Ian Flitcroft. In 2009, Orbiscom was acquired by Mastercard for €72.4 million and became a wholly owned subsidiary still trading under the Orbiscom name.
