= Italian destroyer Aquilone =

Aquilone was the name of at least two ships of the Italian Navy and may refer to:

- Italian destroyer Aquilone (1902), a Nembo-class destroyer launched in 1902 and discarded in 1923.
- Italian destroyer Aquilone (1927), a Turbine-class destroyer launched in 1927 and sunk in 1940.
