= Fallout (Irish TV series) =

- Genre: Docudrama
- Created by: Mark Venner
- Directed by: David Caffrey
- Country of origin: Ireland
- No. of episodes: 2

Production
- Producer: Frontier Films

Original release
- Network: RTÉ One
- Release: 23 April – 24 April 2006

Fallout is a RTÉ two-part fictional, doom laden docudrama. It deals with the nuclear fallout following a hypothetical disaster in the Sellafield Nuclear Reprocessing Plant in Cumbria on the British coast of the Irish Sea. The docu-drama suggests that, due to a changing wind direction, Ireland would bear the brunt of the British accident. The docu-drama was based on the false premise, that such an accident as depicted in the drama could happen and that parts of Ireland would need to be evacuated following a serious accident at Sellafield. Dr Ann McGarry, chief executive of the Radiological Protection Institute of Ireland, said: "The scenario envisaged in the programme is not realistic and grossly exaggerates the amount of radioactivity that could reach Ireland. The RPII cannot envisage any realistic scenario that would cause the radiation levels in Ireland to reach the concentrations as what was depicted in the drama". Following the dramatized accident, the docu-drama depicts Irish evacuation riots, societal collapse and widespread health impacts.

== Episodes ==
=== Part one ===
Part One aired on 23 April 2006, and focuses on the immediate aftermath of the incident and the implications which may arise for the Irish population. The plot is released in the style of "breaking news" (from both RTÉ News and BBC News 24) and as footage captured by a documentary crew and various camera phone video clips from eyewitnesses.

=== Part two ===
Part Two aired 24 April 2006 and is set a year later, dealing with more long-term repercussions such as the social and economic climate. The main characters are revisited and interviewed.

== Criticism ==
Minister for the Environment, Heritage and Local Government Dick Roche criticised the show for "portraying Irish people as barbaric". The accident scenario is considered outlandish. In addition, the Irish government are currently attempting through a court action to close the Sellafield nuclear plant; the topic of the programme may be regarded as being sub judice.

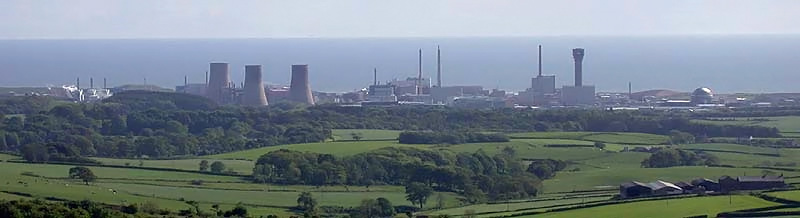
Sellafield facility in 2005.

When attempting to stem leaks found in the Sellafield facility, an explosion occurs. This sets off a further chain of explosions in the HASTs (Highly Active Storage Tank), resulting in the release of a highly radioactive plume. A north-easterly wind carries this radioactive material over the Irish Sea, which hits Ireland's eastern coast, particularly County Louth and the Dublin area (Ireland's main population centre) causing widespread chaos.

The Radiological Protection Institute of Ireland also voiced criticisms at the time of airing, Dr Ann McGarry, chief executive of the Radiological Protection Institute of Ireland, said:

"The scenario envisaged in the programme is not realistic and grossly exaggerates the amount of radioactivity that could reach Ireland. The RPII cannot envisage any realistic scenario that would cause the radiation levels in Ireland to reach the concentrations as what was depicted in the drama".

The RPII was also concerned that the programme appeared to suggest that evacuation would be the appropriate response to an accident at Sellafield. With Dr. McGarry explaining that International best practice indicates that evacuation would not be required as Ireland is at sufficient distance from the British nuclear facilities, that radiation levels arising from an accident would never be sufficiently high to give rise to the effects displayed in the programme.
