= Carnsore Point =

Headland in County Wexford, Ireland

Coordinates: 52°10′14″N 6°21′20″W

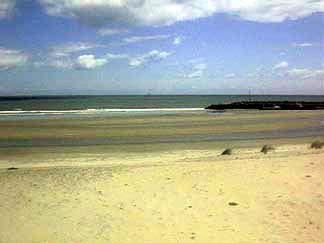
Carne Beach, Carnsore

Carnsore Point (Irish: Carn tSóir or Ceann an Chairn) is a headland in the southeast corner of County Wexford, Ireland. It marks the southernmost point of the Irish Sea, on the western side of St George's Channel.

== History ==
Ptolemy's Geography (2nd century AD) described a point called Ιερον (Hieron, "sacred promontory") which probably referred to Carnsore Point.

Grey Wexford granite from Carnsore Point, as well as Killiney Hill, Dublin was used for construction of parts of the Thames Embankment in London during the 19th century.

== Energy ==
=== Cancelled nuclear project ===
Carnsore was proposed to be the location of a Nuclear Energy Board power plant. If built as proposed in the 1970s, the plant would have produced electricity for the Electricity Supply Board. First proposed in 1968, the then Government of Ireland gave renewed effort to the plans after the 1973 energy crisis. The plan envisaged one, and eventually four, nuclear power stations. However, the plan was eventually abandoned after sustained opposition by environmental groups, including the Wexford group the Nuclear Safety Association. The campaign against the proposed plant also gained some international support, including from Petra Kelly, who gave a speech at Carnsore. One activist against the plant who later became notable was Adi Roche, who went on to found Chernobyl Children International.

Anti-nuclear groups organised a series of rallies and concerts at Carnsore Point from August 1978 to August 1981. Titled "Get to the Point" and "Back to the Point" respectively, and featuring Christy Moore as lead act, the concerts were served to bring to public notice the question of nuclear power in Ireland. The British and Irish Communist Organisation, who believed nuclear power was necessary to achieve socialism in Ireland, picketed the first concert.

=== Wind farm ===
As of 2002, the ESB Group proposed to build a wind farm in the area. The 12 megawatt wind farm began operations in 2003.
