= Radiological Protection Institute of Ireland =

Irish research institute

Coordinates: 53.310179°N 6.237641°W

The Radiological Protection Institute of Ireland (RPII), An Institiúid Éireannach um Chosaint Raideolaíoch, was an independent public body in Ireland under the aegis of the Department of Communications, Climate Action and Environment. The RPII was established in 1992 under the Radiological Protection Act 1991, which conferred on the RPII a broad remit in relation to radiological protection in Ireland. The RPII was merged with the Environmental Protection Agency (EPA) in August 2014, as part of the Irish Government's Public Sector Reform Plan. RPII's functions are now carried out by the Office of Radiation Protection and Environmental Monitoring within the EPA.

The general functions of the ORP are:

- To provide advice to the Government, the Minister for the Environment, Community and Local Government and other Ministers on matters relating to radiological safety.
- To provide information to the public on any matters relating to radiological safety which the ORP deems fit.
- To maintain and develop a national laboratory for the measurement of levels of radioactivity in the environment, and to assess the significance of these levels for the Irish population.
- To provide a personnel dosimetry and instrument calibration service for those who work with ionising radiation.
- To control by licence the custody, use, manufacture, importation, transportation, distribution, exportation and disposal of radioactive substances, irradiating apparatus and other sources of ionising radiation.
- To assist in the development of national plans for emergencies arising from nuclear accidents and to act in support of such plans.
- To provide a radioactivity measurement and certification service.
- To prepare codes and regulations for the safe use of ionising radiation.
- To carry out and promote research in relevant fields.
- To monitor developments abroad relating to nuclear installations and radiological safety generally, and to keep the Government informed of their implications for Ireland.
- To co-operate with the relevant authorities in other states and with appropriate international organisations.
- To represent the State on international bodies.
- To be the competent authority under international conventions on nuclear matters.

The RPII was the successor to the Nuclear Energy Board which was formally wound up by the Radiological Protection Act 1991.

== See also ==
- Office of Emergency Planning (OEP)
- Nuclear Energy Board
- Civil Defence Ireland
- Sellafield
- Society for Radiological Protection
