= HMS Magicienne (1849) =

Frigate of the Royal Navy

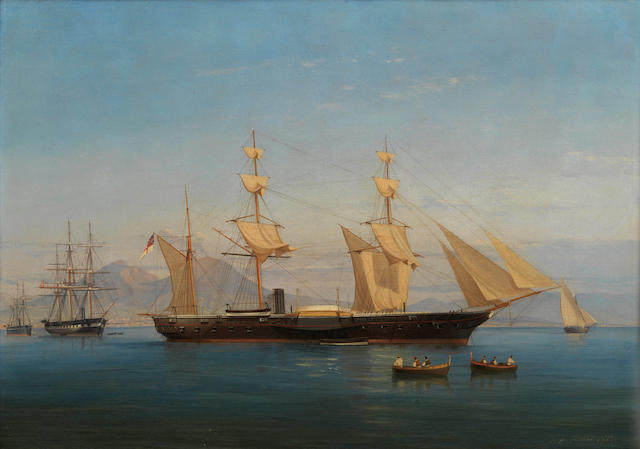
- HMS Magicienne in the Bay of Naples

History

United Kingdom
- Name: Magicienne
- Ordered: 25 April 1847
- Builder: Pembroke Dockyard
- Laid down: September 1847
- Launched: 7 March 1849
- Completed: 20 February 1853
- Fate: Sold for scrap, September 1866

General characteristics (as built)
- Class & type: Magicienne-class second-class paddle frigate
- Tons burthen: 1,25812/94 bm
- Length: 210 ft (64 m)
- Beam: 36 ft (11 m)
- Draught: 8 ft 4 in (2.5 m) (deep load)
- Depth of hold: 24 ft 6 in (7.47 m)
- Installed power: 400 nhp, 1,300 ihp (970 kW)
- Propulsion: Paddle wheels; oscillating steam engines
- Speed: 9–10 knots (17–19 km/h; 10–12 mph)
- Complement: 175
- Armament: Gundeck: 10 × 32 pdr guns; Upper deck: 1 × 68-pounder gun, 1 × 10 in (250 mm) gun, 4 × 32 pdr guns

HMS Magicienne was the lead ship of her class of two 16-gun, steam-powered second-class paddle frigates built for the Royal Navy in the 1850s. Commissioned in 1853 she played a small role in the Crimean War of 1854–1855 and was sold for scrap in 1866.

== Design and construction ==
The Magicienne-class ships had a length at the gun deck of 210 feet (64 m) and 185 feet 6 inches (56.5 m) at the keel. They had a beam of 36 feet (11 m), and a depth of hold of 24 feet 6 inches (7.5 m). Magicienne's tonnage was 1,25812/94 tons burthen and she had a draught of 8 feet 4 inches (2.5 m). Their crew numbered 175 officers and ratings.

The ships were fitted with a pair of 2-cylinder oscillating steam engines, rated at 400 nominal horsepower, that drove their paddlewheels. The engines produced 1,300 indicated horsepower (970 kW) in service that gave them speeds of 9–10 knots (17–19 km/h; 10–12 mph). The ships were armed with eight 32-pounder (56 cwt) (Note: "Cwt" is the abbreviation for hundredweight, 56 cwt referring to the weight of the gun.) cannon on the gundeck. On the upper deck were one each 68-pounder (95 cwt) and a 10-inch (254 mm) (85 cwt) shell guns as well as four more 32-pounders.

Magicienne and her sister ship Valorous were originally ordered on 25 April 1847 as first-class sloops to John Edye's design, approved on 12 August 1847. On 5 August they were re-ordered as 210 ft (64 m) vessels. When completed, they constituted the last group of paddle warships built for the Royal Navy.

== Career ==
Magicienne was laid down at Pembroke Dockyard in September 1847, launched on 7 March 1849 and completed on 20 February 1853.

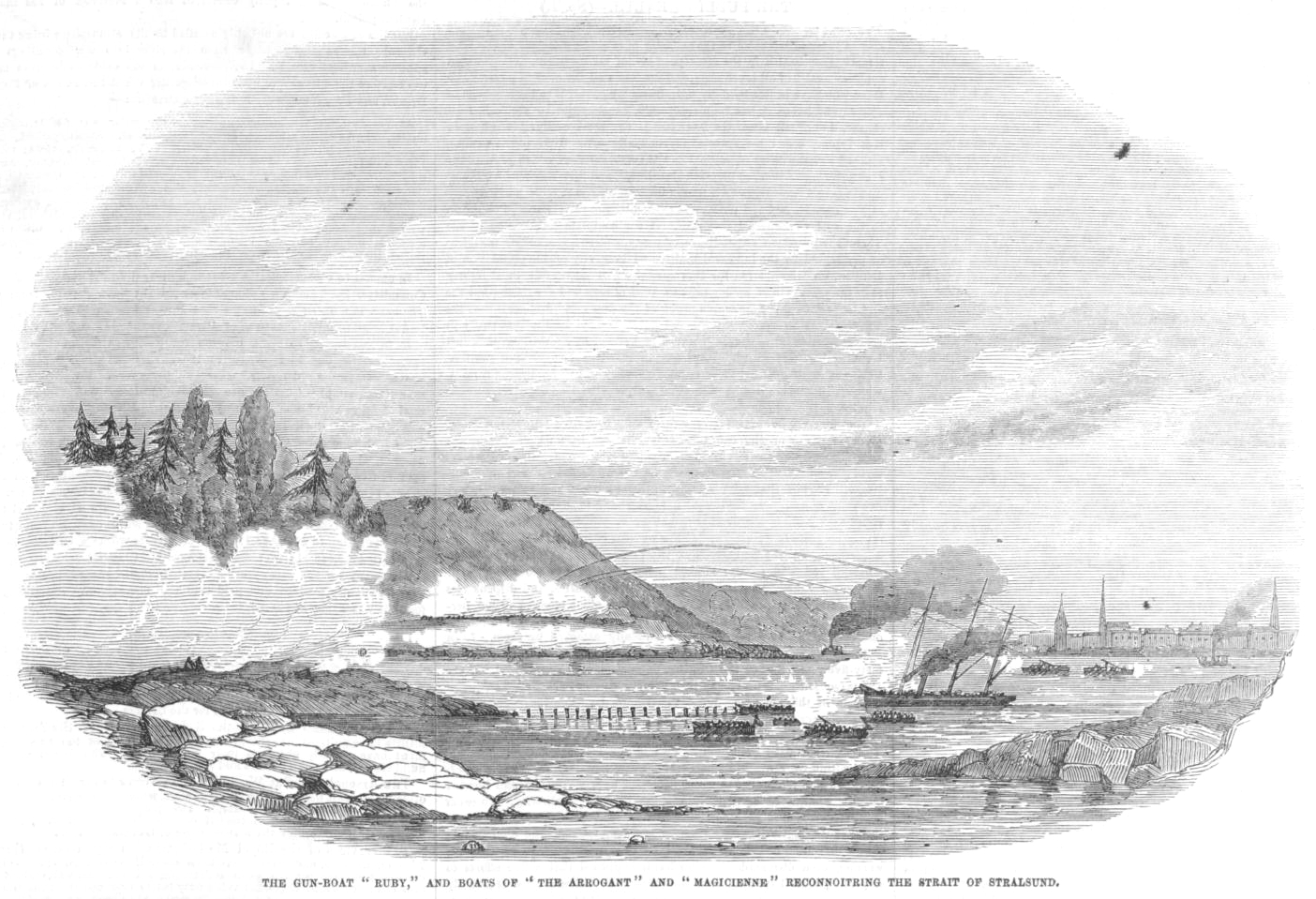
The Gun-Boat Ruby, and boats of the Arrogant and Magicienne reconnoitring the Strait of Stralsund, 1855

The ship was sent to the Baltic Sea during the Crimean War.

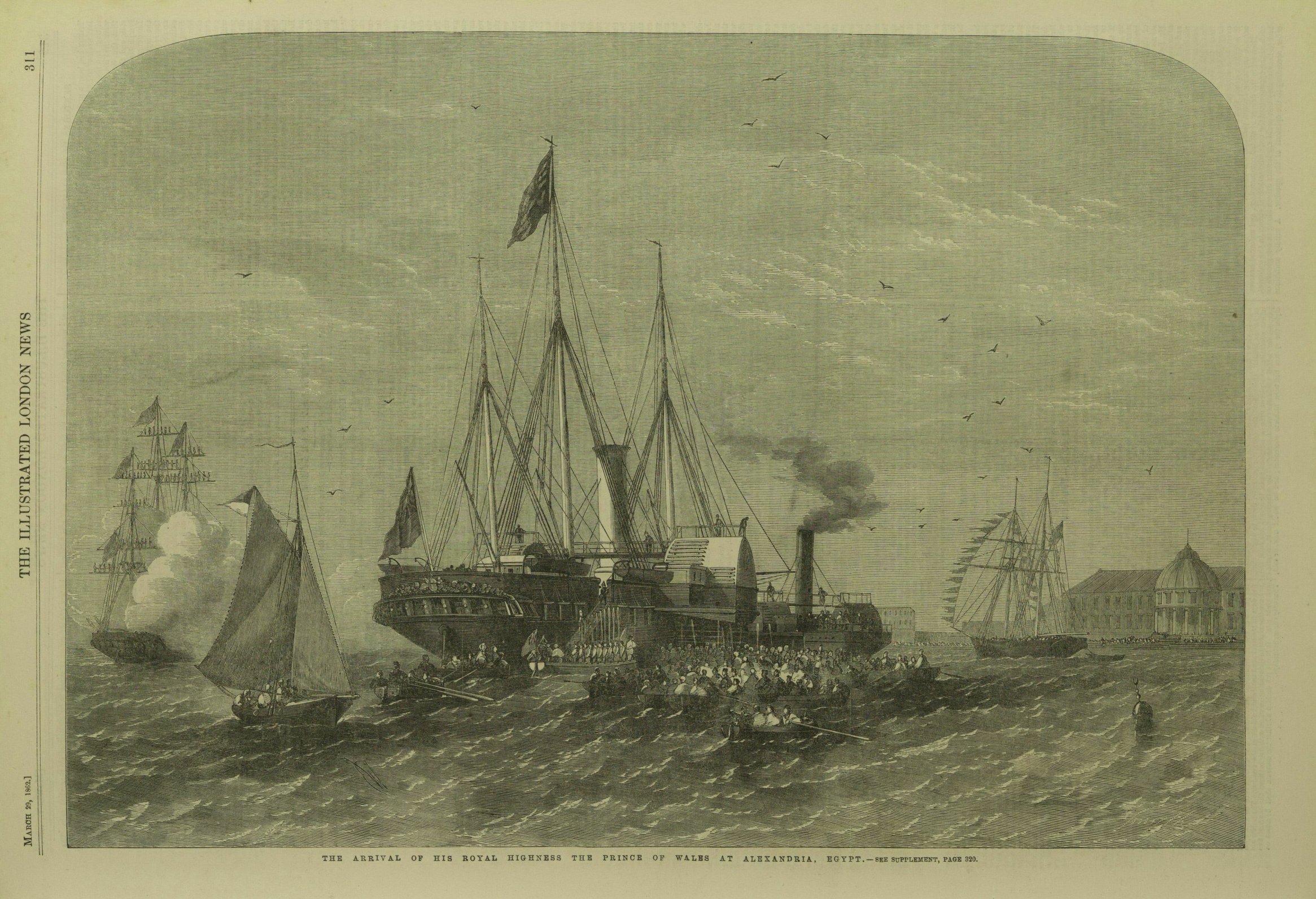
Magicienne (far left) with HMY Osborne. The Arrival of the Prince of Wales at Alexandria in 1862

She was sold for scrap to Marshall of Plymouth in September 1866.
