= Indonesia and weapons of mass destruction =

Republic of Indonesia
- Nuclear program start date: 1964 (claimed, ended in 1966)
- First nuclear weapon test: October 5, 1965 (intended, never carried out)
- Total tests: None
- Current stockpile: None
- NPT party: Yes (1970)

Indonesia currently does not possess any weapons of mass destruction (WMD) such as nuclear weapons nor does it have the capability to develop them. However, the country has natural resources suitable for nuclear energy production, such as uranium and thorium. During the 1960s, it was known that Indonesia attempted to develop nuclear weapons either independently or by cooperation with a nuclear states such as China and the Soviet Union. No official program was ever established, but research and production efforts were claimed to be underway. The ambition was ultimately abandoned by the New Order government.

Indonesia is currently a strong advocate for nuclear disarmament and the peaceful use of nuclear energy. The country has signed and ratified numerous non-proliferation treaties and conventions—nuclear, biological, and chemical weapons—starting in 1970 until its most recent in 2017.

== Early nuclear ambitions ==
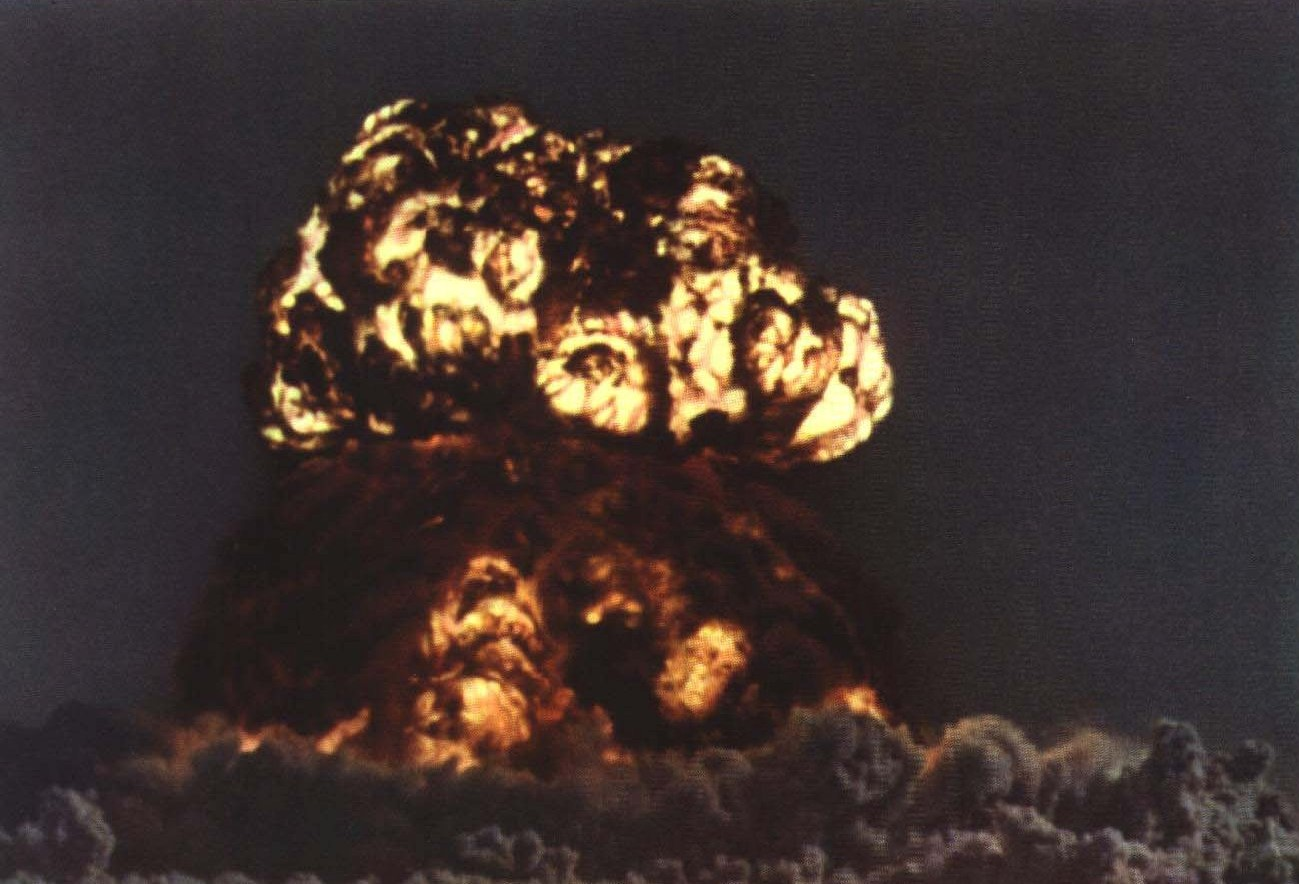
Project 596, the first nuclear weapon test by an Asian country.

In the 1960s during the Sukarno administration, Indonesia sought to acquire and test nuclear weapons. After Project 596 conducted by the People's Republic of China on October 16, 1964, the Indonesian government publicized their intent to acquire a nuclear weapon. Many speculated that Indonesia would acquire the bomb by requesting assistance from the PRC through the newly created Jakarta–Peking Axis.

On November 15, 1964, a month after the Project 596 conducted by the PRC, Brig. Gen. Hartono Wirjodiprodjo, director of the Army Arsenal, stated that Indonesia would probably be able to detonate its own atomic bomb by 1965 with research already underway, The New York Times reported via Antara. He went even further on February 2, 1965, claiming that 200 Indonesian atomic scientists were conducting tests for the production of an atomic bomb. Hartono also stated that it would be a "surprise" for the upcoming Armed Forces Day on October 5, which many interpreted as a possible date for an Indonesian nuclear test.

In a speech during a Muhammadiyah Congress in Bandung on July 24, 1965, Sukarno declared that the country would possess a nuclear weapon in the near future.

Insyaallah, dalam waktu dekat ini kita akan berhasil membuat bom atom sendiri.

[God willing, in the near future we will succeed in making our own atomic bomb.]

— Sukarno, in Teuku Reza Fadeli, Nuklir Sukarno: Kajian Awal atas Politik Tenaga Atom Indonesia 1958–1967.

This statement marked a shift in Indonesia's nuclear development, from "atoms for peace" into defense and military purposes as well.

Nevertheless, the United States viewed Indonesia as incapable of developing a nuclear weapon independently. The U.S. Embassy in Jakarta regarded Sukarno's statement as purely propaganda. Some officials from the U.S. Department of State also interpreted his statement as either a request for a Chinese nuclear test in Indonesian waters while allowing Sukarno to take credit for it, or a potential Chinese test with Indonesian involvement and collaborations in it.

However, on September 30, 1965, a failed coup d'état—dubbed the 30 September Movement—led to the ousting of Sukarno and the rise of Suharto, who eventually became the second president of Indonesia, who showed no interest in pursuing nuclear weapons. The research was abandoned by the New Order government and marked the end of Indonesia's ambition to acquire such weapons.

== Nuclear research and supervising agencies ==
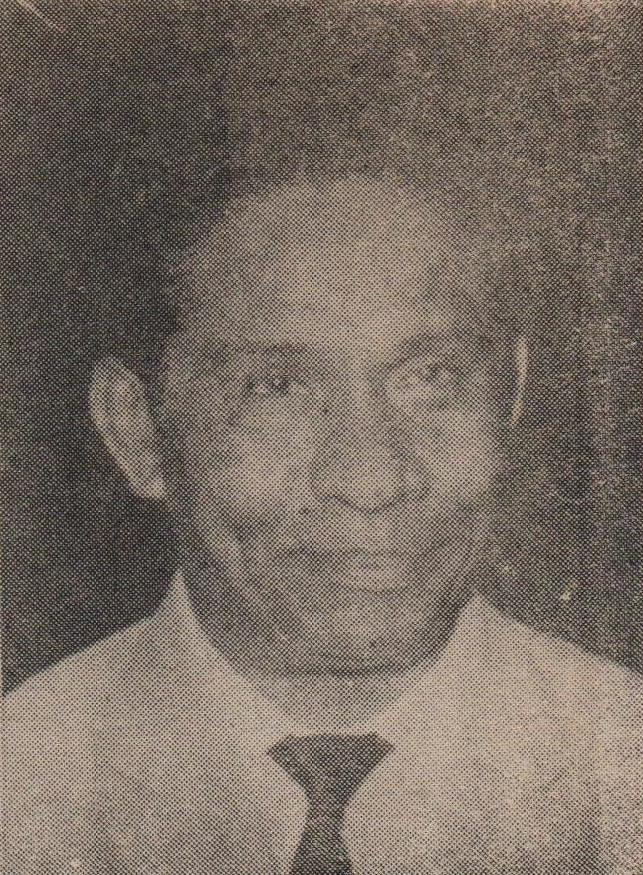
G. A. Siwabessy, Minister of the National Atomic Energy Agency.

In 1958, the Institute of Atomic Energy (Lembaga Tenaga Atom, LTA) was established by the Indonesian government to supervise nuclear research and develop atomic energy. The LTA was limited to conducting peaceful research, including the planning and construction of reactors in cooperation with the United States and the Soviet Union.

Recognizing the growing strategic importance of nuclear weapons, Sukarno reorganized and renamed the agency as the National Atomic Energy Agency (Badan Tenaga Atom Nasional, BATAN). Although the idea of developing a nuclear weapon was eventually abandoned, BATAN was renamed to National Nuclear Energy Agency (Badan Tenaga Nuklir Nasional, BATAN) and continued to serve as the country's main national nuclear research agency until its dissolution.

In 2021, during the Widodo administration, BATAN was formally dissolved and integrated into the National Research and Innovation Agency (Badan Riset dan Inovasi Nasional, BRIN), alongside other Indonesian national research agencies, with its functions transferred to the newly established Research Organization for Nuclear Energy (Organisasi Riset Tenaga Nuklir, ORTN). To ensure the safety, security, and compliance with international standards in the use of nuclear energy, the Nuclear Energy Regulatory Agency (Badan Pengawas Tenaga Nuklir, BAPETEN) was established back in 1998.

== Research facilities ==
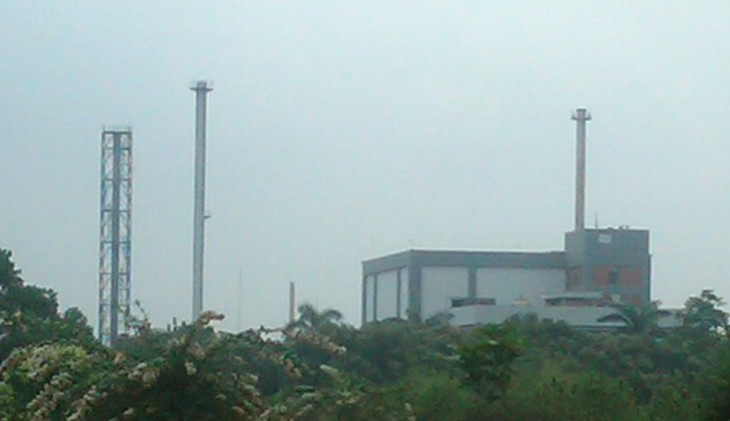
RSG-GAS research reactor, built in 1987.

Indonesia currently has three nuclear research facilities, all located on the island of Java. These facilities were originally managed by BATAN and are now by the ORTN under BRIN, supervised by BAPETEN. The first reactor, built in 1965 in Bandung, uses the TRIGA Mark II reactor, supplied by the United States. The second, the Kartini Reactor in Yogyakarta, was built in 1979 and also uses a TRIGA Mark II design, but smaller in capacity compared to the Bandung reactor. The third and most advanced is the Gerrit Augustinus Siwabessy Multipurpose Reactor (RSG-GAS), located in South Tangerang, which began operation in 1987. Indonesia has also announced plans to build nuclear power plants for electricity generation and it is projected to be ready by 2030 or 2035 in cooperation with countries such as Canada, Russia, and China.

== Treaties and conventions ==
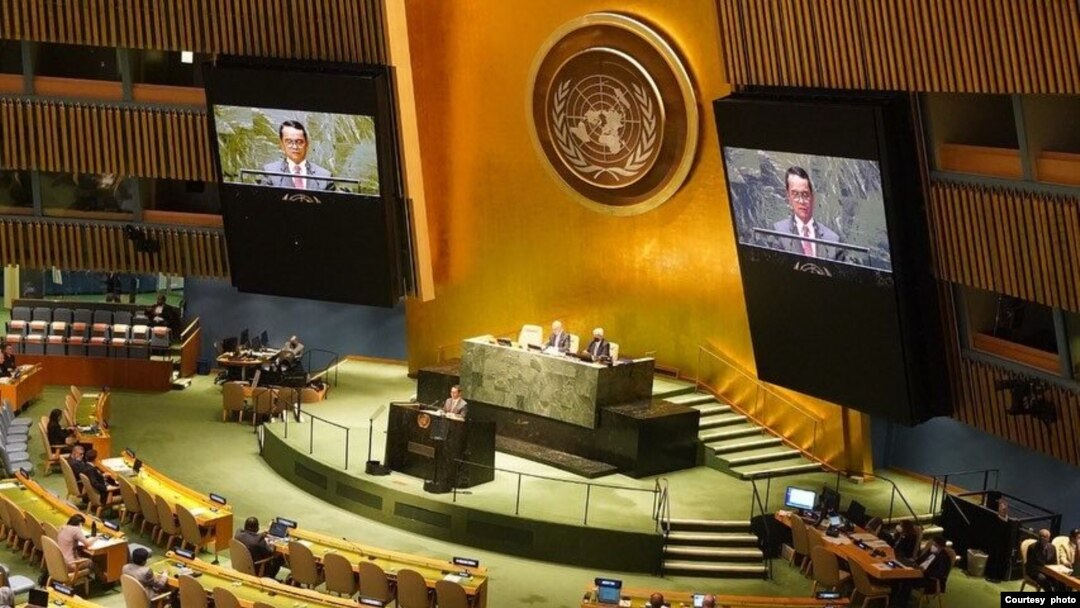
Indonesian Paper which promotes the elimination of nuclear weapons and the use of nuclear technology for peaceful purposes being presented at the UN NNP Forum in 2022.

Indonesia has signed and ratified the Treaty on the Non-Proliferation of Nuclear Weapons (NPT) in 1970 and 1978, the Biological Weapons Convention (BWC) in 1972 and 1991, the Chemical Weapons Convention (CWC) in 1993 and 1998, the Comprehensive Nuclear-Test-Ban Treaty (CTBT) in 1998 and 2012, as well as the Treaty on the Prohibition of Nuclear Weapons (TPNW) in 2017 and 2023. Indonesia is also one of the ten listing parties of the Southeast Asian Nuclear-Weapon-Free Zone Treaty (SEANWFZ) which prohibits the development, manufacture, acquisition, possession, or control over nuclear weapons. The country signed the SEANWFZ in 1995 and ratified it in 1997.

== See also ==
- Indonesian National Armed Forces
- Myanmar and weapons of mass destruction
- Nuclear power in Indonesia
- Philippines and weapons of mass destruction
