= Hydrometallurgy Pilot Plant =

Egyptian research complex

- Established: 1982 (Partially operational)
- Research type: Basic nuclear science
- Field of research: Radiochemistry
- Location: Inshas, Egypt
- Affiliations: Nuclear Research Center
- Operating agency: Egyptian Atomic Energy Authority

The Hydrometallurgy Pilot Plant (HPP) is a hot cell laboratory complex, dedicated to perform bench-scale radiochemistry experiments including the separation of plutonium and uranium from the spent fuel rods of the ETRR-1 research reactor and was established in 1982. The HPP is owned and operated by the Egyptian Atomic Energy Authority (AEA) at the Nuclear Research Center in Inshas, northeast of Cairo.

== History ==
At the late of 1970s, Egypt was motivated to build eight nuclear power plants and to develop experience at the back end of a nuclear fuel cycle and was concluded several contracts with an unnamed foreign company to build the Hydrometallurgy Pilot Plant (HPP).

HPP was originally designed as a nuclear reprocessing facility, and in 1982, the second laboratory became operational.

== Overview ==
The HPP consists of three laboratories, the first laboratory consists of three hot cells (modules 1-3) with the first module, is shielded alpha particle cell dedicated for mechanical shearing of research reactor fuel, it was unfinished due to the inability to secure the necessary export licence for the shearing equipment from the foreign vendor. The second module, is dissolver and mixer-settlers for first stage fission product separation. The third module, was designed for waste vitrification with no equipment had been installed.

The second laboratory contains two modules, module 4, which is a lead shielded glove box for second stage fission product separation using mixer settlers, while module 5, is an unshielded glove box for the separation of plutonium from uranium.

The third laboratory consists of two connected glove box lines suitable for plutonium chemistry but which contain no equipment.

HPP possess a minor plutonium processing capacity and unable to reprocess and extract weapons-grade plutonium from the spent fuel of the research reactors due to the inability to complete the facility, however, Egypt decided to use one cell of the HPP within the framework of a project for the management of unused and orphan radioactive sealed sources, which provides Egypt with the research capabilities on the back-end of nuclear fuel cycle.

== Undeclared nuclear materials and activities ==
In early 2001, the International Atomic Energy Agency (IAEA) detected particles of actinides and fission products near the HPP facility, which shed light on the existence of the HPP.

In November 2004 and January 2005, Egypt declared that, in 1987, it had carried out acceptance tests in the HPP using unirradiated uranyl nitrate in chemical reagents purchased from the local market while the uranyl nitrate had been mixed with a solution obtained from the dissolution of domestically produced scrap UO_{2} pellets (with 1.9 kg of uranium compounds). Egypt rationalized that it did not inform the IAEA about the facility, materials nor their use in the tests as the HPP never completed and it was designed for bench scale radiochemistry experiments, while Egypt should have declared the HPP to the Agency as early as possible prior to the introduction of nuclear material into the facility, according to the Safeguards Agreement which came into force in 1982. Therefore, between 2004 and 2006, Egypt had submitted design information for the HPP and had provide inventory change reports (ICRs) with respect to the acceptance tests.

In 2009, The IAEA's Safeguards Implementation Report (SIR) for 2008, concludes that earlier issues of undeclared nuclear activities and material reported to the Board of Governors in February 2005 are no longer outstanding.

== See also ==
- Nuclear program of Egypt
- Egyptian Atomic Energy Authority
- ETRR-1
