= List of weapons of mass destruction by country =

The following countries have either attempted to develop, actually built, or bought weapons of mass destruction, including biological, chemical, and nuclear weapons.

== List ==
Legend:

- C (Confirmed)
- S (Sharing)
- D (Developing)
- A (Attempted)
- P (Potential)
- F (Former)
- N (Never)

Programs per country	Biological	Chemical	Nuclear
Albania	N	F	N
Algeria	N	N	A
Argentina	N	N	A
Australia	N	F	A
Brazil	N	N	A
Bulgaria	N	F	F
Canada	F	F	F
China	P	F	C
Egypt	N	C	N
France	F	F	C
Germany	F	F	S
India	F	F	C
Iran	N	F	D
Iraq	F	F	A
Israel	P	P	C
Italy	F	F	S
Indonesia	N	N	A
Japan	F	F	A
Kazakhstan	N	N	F
Libya	N	F	A
Mexico	N	N	A
Myanmar	N	P	P
Netherlands	N	F	S
North Korea	C	C	C
Pakistan	N	N	C
Philippines	N	N	A
Poland	N	N	F
Rhodesia	F	F	N
Romania	N	N	A
Russia	C	C	C
Saudi Arabia	N	N	P
South Africa	F	F	F
South Korea	N	N	A
Spain	N	N	A
Sweden	N	F	A
Switzerland	N	F	A
Syria	N	C	P
Taiwan	P	F	A
Ukraine	N	N	F
United Kingdom	F	F	C
United States	F	F	C
