= Fuel Manufacturing Pilot Plant =

Nuclear fuel fabrication facility

- Location of Fuel Manufacturing Pilot
- Built: December 1998
- Location: Nuclear Research Center, Inshas, Egypt
- Coordinates: 30°17′34.0″N 31°24′38.5″E
- Industry: Uranium Fuel Fabrication
- Products: MTR-type fuel plates
- Owner: Egyptian Atomic Energy Authority

The Fuel Manufacturing Pilot Plant (FMPP), also known as Fuel Element Fabrication Plant, is a nuclear fuel fabrication facility supplied by the Argentine company INVAP in 1998. The FMPP is considered a Material Testing Reactor (MTR)-type fuel element facility, that produces the fuel elements required for the research reactor ETRR-2.

The plant uses enriched uranium hexafluoride (UF6, 19.75% U235) as a raw material which is processed to produce the final MTR-type fuel elements.

The FMPP is owned and operated by the Egyptian Atomic Energy Authority (AEA) at the Nuclear Research Center in Inshas, 60 kilometers northeast of Cairo.

== History ==
The Egyptian Atomic Energy Authority (AEA) contracted with the Argentine company INVAP to construct the Fuel Manufacturing Pilot Plant (FMPP) at the Nuclear Research Center in Inshas with the construction works began in 1995, with pre-operational tests in 1997, and a final complete production in December 1998.

The National Atomic Energy Commission (CNEA) was responsible for the technology transfer and Egyptian staff training during the commissioning and installation of FMPP by personnel from the (Uranium Powder Manufacturing Plant) and the (Research Reactors Fuel Elements Plant) were both plants in CNEA served as a FMPP design basis. During the setup of the facility a fuel element was manufactured using natural uranium firstly and then another one using 20% enriched uranium.

== Overview ==
The Fuel Manufacturing Pilot Plant (FMPP) is considered the most sophisticated fuel cycle facility in Egypt, which is a semi-pilot facility produces the fuel elements required by the Egyptian second research reactor ETRR-2.

FMPP has a production design capacity of 40 fuel element per year, with a total uranium content of 2054 g each and 220 days of estimated annual working time in two shifts with 8 hours each, which is sufficient to ensure continuous ETRR-2 reactor operation.

FMPP is under IAEA safeguards.

== See also ==
- ETRR-1
- ETRR-2
- Nuclear program of Egypt
- Egyptian Atomic Energy Authority
