= Radioisotope Production Facility =

Radioisotopes Production Facility
- Location of Radioisotopes Production Facility
- Operated: November 2011
- Location: Nuclear Research Center, Inshas, Egypt
- Coordinates: 30°17′33.1″N 31°24′35.6″E
- Products: ^{51}Cr, ^{125}I, ^{131}I, ^{192}Ir, ^{99}Mo and Technetium-99m generators loading
- Area: 1,200 m^{2} (13,000 sq ft)
- Owner: Egyptian Atomic Energy Authority

Radioisotopes Production Facility (RPF), is a facility for the production of radioisotopes from irradiation of Low enriched uranium (LEU) in the Egyptian Second Research Reactor (ETRR-2) Complex. The RPF was supplied by the Argentine company Investigacion Aplicada (INVAP) and was commissioned during October and November 2011. The produced radioisotopes are used in medicine, industry and research activities for domestic market.

The RPF is owned and operated by the Egyptian Atomic Energy Authority (EAEA) at the Nuclear Research Center in Inshas, 60 kilometers northeast of Cairo.

== History ==
Radioisotopes Production Facility (RPF) was initially highlighted during the 2004/2005 investigation by the International Atomic Energy Agency (IAEA), as Egypt declared the new facility which was under construction to the agency. Egypt should have reported the decision to construct the new facility no later than 1997 and it was considered failure to report. Egypt took a corrective actions and provided a modified design information for the RPF.

RPF was officially inaugurated by the former Prime Minister, Ibrahim Mahlab on 15 August 2015 and the ceremony was attended by Conrado Assenza, the Associate Ambassador of Argentina in Egypt; Mohamed Shaker, the Minister of Electricity and Energy of Egypt; Sherif Hamad, the Minister of Scientific Research of Egypt; Atef Abdel Fattah, the President of the Egyptian Atomic Energy Authority (EAEA) and Yasser Tawfik, the project director.

== Overview ==
Radioisotopes Production Facility (RPF) is located at the Nuclear Research Center in Inshas, near ETRR-2 research reactor and Fuel Manufacturing Pilot Plant (FMPP) as the three facilities share the same auxiliary services with high degree of integration between ETRR-2 and RPF to ensure safe transfer of the irradiated targets for radioisotope production.

RPF is a Low enriched uranium (LEU) based facility using 19.75% enriched uranium, as the targets prepared at RPF laboratory then manually transferred to the ETRR2 reactor, where the targets are loaded into the irradiation device. The device is installed in the irradiation position in grid or core from the pool head. The molybdenum targets are irradiated in the core position while non-molybdenum targets, placed in aluminium cans to be irradiated in the grid around the core.

The produced high-level waste from the RPF, stored near the ETRR-2 reactor waiting for final disposal in deep geological formations.

=== Layout ===
RPF divided into free, supervised and controlled areas. The free area where no radioactive material is handled, contain offices, dressing rooms and common services. The supervised area with minimum radioactivity level, contain quality control laboratories and cell-front operation areas. The controlled area with highest radioactivity, consist of hot cells, cell ventilation filters and management areas of gas, liquid, and solid.

RPF provided with 12 hot cells as the following:

- Molybdenum-99 Production Hot Cells - four hot cells.
- Iodine-131 Production Hot Cell - one hot cell.
- Iodine-125 Production Hot Cell - one hot cell.
- Chromium-51 Production Hot Cell - one hot cell.
- Iridium-192 Production Hot Cells - two hot cells.
- Technetium-99m generator Loading Hot Cell - one hot cell.
- Multi-Purpose Production hot cell - one hot cell (for compound labeling and production of other radioisotopes).
- Activity Control Hot Cell - one hot cell (radioisotope calibration and activity control prior to dispatch).

== Products ==
Radioisotopes Production Facility is capable of producing the following:

- Chromium-51, through the irradiation of potassium chromate targets (0.5 Ci per week), used as injectable medical product.
- Iodine 125, through the irradiation of xenon gas (5 Ci per week), used for nuclear medicine.
- Iodine-131, through the fission of LEU (10 Ci per week), which used for nuclear medicine.
- Iridium-192, through the irradiation of natural iridium sheets (100 Ci per month), used for industrial gamma radiography.
- Iridium-192 wire, through the irradiation of iridium-platinum-alloy targets for brachytherapy.
- Molybdenum-99, through the fission of LEU plate targets (1000 Ci per week), which used for medical diagnosis.

The obtained Molybdenum-99, Iodine 125, Iridium 192 and Iodine 131 batches have outperformed the contracted values with molybdenum batches exceeded contractual values by 5 to 10% and the quality of the product has been higher than the technical requirements and at least equal to the product obtained by CNEA in Argentina.

== See also ==
- Hot Laboratory and Waste Management Center
- ETRR-2
- Fuel Manufacturing Pilot Plant
