= Neutron research facility =

A neutron research facility is most commonly a big laboratory operating a large-scale neutron source that provides thermal neutrons to a suite of research instruments. The neutron source usually is a research reactor or a spallation source. In some cases, a smaller facility will provide high energy neutrons (e.g. 2.5 MeV or 14 MeV fusion neutrons) using existing neutron generator technologies.

== List of neutron facilities ==
The following list is intended to be exhaustive and to cover active facilities as well as those that are shut down.

Australia

- ANSTO-HIFAR Reactor, Sydney
- Open-pool Australian lightwater reactor (OPAL)

Bangladesh

- Atomic Energy Research Establishment (AERE), Bangladesh Atomic Energy Commission (BAEC)

Canada

- NRC Canadian Neutron Beam Centre at Chalk River Laboratories
- RE-Labs Inc. – Single Event Effects Testing Services

China

- China Spallation Neutron Source – Dongguan, Guangdong.
- CNPG – Light ion (D,T), China Institute of Atomic Energy
- HI-13 – Light ion (D,T), China Institute of Atomic Energy

Czech Republic

- Neutron Physics Laboratory (within CANAM infrastructure)

Denmark

- Risø (reactors 1958–2000)

Egypt

- ETRR-1 – Nuclear Research Center, Inshas (1961–)
- ETRR-2 – Nuclear Research Center, Inshas (1997–)

France

- ILL – Institut Laue–Langevin (1972–)
- LLB – Laboratoire Léon Brillouin at CEA Saclay
- NFS – GANIL

Germany

- FRM I – Technical University, Garching (1957–2000)
- FRM II – Technical University, Garching (2004–)
- FRMZ –Johannes Gutenberg-Universität, Mainz (1967–)
- FRJ-2 at Forschungszentrum Jülich (1962–2006)
- Jülich Centre for Neutron Science (2005–), a virtual facility that operates instruments at other facilities (FRM II, ILL, SNS)
- FRG-1 – GKSS, Geesthacht near Hamburg (1958–2010)
- Helmholtz-Zentrum Berlin, formerly HMI – Hahn-Meitner-Institut

Hungary

- KFKI Research Institutes, Budapest

India

- Dhruva, CIRUS and Apsara: Bhabha Atomic Research Centre, Mumbai
- KAMINI

Indonesia

- Neutron Scattering Laboratory – National Nuclear Energy Agency (BATAN)

Japan

- JAERI – Japan Atomic Energy Research Institute
- KENS – High Energy Accelerator Organisation, KEK
- KURRI – Research Reactor Institute (Kyoto)
- JSNS – (part of the Japan proton accelerator research complex (J-PARC)

Netherlands

- RID – Reactor Institute Delft, Delft University of Technology

Norway

- IFE – Jeep 2 reactor at Kjeller Institute for Energy Technology

Poland

- Maria reactor – POLATOM Institute of Nuclear Energy, Świerk-Otwock
- Ewa reactor – POLATOM Institute of Nuclear Energy, Świerk-Otwock (1958–1995)

Pakistan

- PARR-l – Pakistan Institute of Nuclear Science & Technology, Nilore-Islamabad
- PARR-ll – Pakistan Institute of Nuclear Science & Technology, Nilore-Islamabad

Russia

- IBR Fast Pulsed Reactors (Dubna)
- JINR – Joint Institute for Nuclear Research, Dubna
- WWR-M, Gatchina
- PIK, Gatchina

South Africa

- NECSA SAFARI-1

South Korea

- High-Flux Advanced Neutron Application Reactor (HANARO) – Korea Atomic Energy Research Institute (KAERI)

Sweden

- NFL – Studsvik Neutron Research Laboratory, Studsvik
- ESS – European Spallation Source (project)

Switzerland

- SINQ@PSI – Paul Scherrer Institute
- UCN@PSI – Paul Scherrer Institute – Ultra Cold Neutron Source
- n_TOF – CERN

Ukraine

- Kharkiv Institute of Physics and Technology neutron source facility

United Kingdom

- DIDO
- ISIS Neutron and Muon Source, Rutherford Appleton Laboratory, Oxfordshire

United States

- HFBR – High Flux Beam Reactor, Brookhaven (1965–1996)
- IPNS – Intense Pulsed Neutron Source, Argonne National Laboratory (1981–2008)
- LANSCE – Los Alamos Neutron Science Center (Los Alamos)
- LENS – Low Energy Neutron Source, Indiana University, Bloomington, IN.
- NIST – Center for Neutron Research, Gaithersburg near Washington D.C.
- NSL – Neutron Science Laboratory, University of Michigan College of Engineering.
- HFIR – High Flux Isotope Reactor, Oak Ridge National Laboratory
- SNS – Spallation Neutron Source, Oak Ridge National Laboratory
- MURR – University of Missouri Research Reactor, Columbia, MO.
- MNRC – MacClellan Nuclear Research Center, Sacramento, CA.
- RPI LINAC - Rensselaer Gaerttner LINAC Center, Troy, NY.
