= Nuclear program of Egypt =

Nuclear power plants in Egypt (view)
Under construction

President Adly Mansour announced on 7 November 2013 that Egypt was restarting its nuclear power program in El Dabaa; a deal was reached with the residents in which it was agreed that a residential area will also be built. The Egyptian minister of electricity, Ahmed Emam, has called the project "necessary" because of a small amount of renewable energy sources and not enough fuel. As of 2026, Egypt is actively constructing its first nuclear power plant at El Dabaa, consisting of four VVER-1200 reactors.

== History ==
The Egyptian nuclear power program was started in 1954 as the first research reactor ETRR-1 was acquired from the Soviet Union in 1958 and was opened by Gamal Abdel Nasser at Inchass, Nile Delta. The disposal of its spent fuel was controlled by the Soviets.

In 1964, a 150 MWe nuclear power station was proposed, followed by a 600 MWe proposal in 1974. Also, the Nuclear Power Plants Authority (NPPA) was established in 1976, and in 1983 the El Dabaa site on the Mediterranean coast was selected. The nuclear program was then rejected just after Egypt's defeat by Israel in the Six-Day War in 1967 and the weakening of the Egyptian economy.

In 1968 Egypt signed the Nuclear Non-Proliferation Treaty but postponed ratifying it citing evidence that Israel had undertaken a nuclear weapons program. Consequently, Egypt lost many of its nuclear experts and scientists who had to travel abroad to seek work opportunities. Some of them joined the Iraqi nuclear program and others emigrated to Canada. Egypt's nuclear plans were frozen after the Chernobyl accident.. Egypt eventually ratified the treaty in 1981.

In 1992, Egypt acquired a 22MW multi-purpose research reactor ETRR-2 from Argentina.

In 2006, Egypt announced it would revive its civilian nuclear power programme, and within 10 years build a 1,000 megawatt nuclear power station at El Dabaa. It was estimated to cost US$1.5bn, and it would be constructed with the participation of foreign investors. In March 2008, Egypt signed with Russia an agreement on the peaceful uses of nuclear energy.

As of 2012, after years of stop-start efforts, Egypt's nuclear energy ambitions were once again in flux. El Dabaa had been targeted by protesters who were claiming that their land was wrongly taken by the government to make way for the nuclear plant. As of 2012, as a result of those protests, the site was shut down. The Morsi government did not make any statements about its plans for the plant since construction was suspended.

Egypt withdrew from talks regarding the implementation and effectiveness of the Non-Proliferation Treaty (NPT) in Geneva on 29 April 2013, but remains a ratifier of the NPT.

In November 2015, Egypt signed an intergovernmental agreement with Russia to build and operate the plant. In December 2016, Egypt signed the Engineering, Procurement, and Construction (EPC) contracts with Russian state nuclear company Rosatom for four VVER-1200 units, which became fully effective in December 2017. The agreement specifies that Russia will supply nuclear fuel throughout the lifecycle of the plant, arrange for personnel training, and assist in operation and maintenance for the first 10 years.

Construction officially began on Unit 1 on 20 July 2022, followed by Unit 2 on 19 November 2022, Unit 3 on 3 May 2023, and Unit 4 on 23 January 2024. By late 2025, the project was progressing on schedule, marked by the installation of the reactor pressure vessel at Unit 1 in November 2025. Commercial operation of the first units is expected to begin around 2028, with all four units planned for completion by 2029–2030, eventually generating approximately 9% of the country's electricity. In May 2026, President Abdel Fattah El-Sisi ratified legislative amendments to Law No. 7 of 2010 (Law No. 10 of 2026) to strengthen nuclear safety and regulatory oversight as the peaceful program continues to expand.

In August 2022, state-run Korea Hydro and Nuclear Power (KHNP) signed a $2.2 billion deal with Russian state-run ASE (a subsidiary of Rosatom) to assist with construction and construct the turbine islands for the plant.

== Undeclared nuclear activity ==
In late 2004 and early 2005, the International Atomic Energy Agency (IAEA) started to investigate undisclosed experiments, which was published in open sources by former and current staff of the AEA, that indicated nuclear material, activities and facilities connected to uranium extraction, conversion, irradiation and reprocessing that unreported to the agency and a team of Agency inspectors visited the Nuclear Research Center in Inshas from 9 to 13 October 2004.

On 14 February 2005, IAEA's Director General Mohamed ElBaradei circulated a report to the board of Governors finding "a number of failures by Egypt to report to the agency in accordance with its obligations."

Egypt justified its reporting failures as the government and the IAEA had "differing interpretations" of Egypt's safeguards obligations and emphasizing that the country's "nuclear activities are strictly for peaceful purposes." Accordingly, Egypt had taken corrective actions and maintained full cooperation during the 2004/2005 investigation, which ended that the IAEA found no discrepancies between what have been declared during the investigation and IAEA's findings and no evidences of extraction of plutonium or enrichment of uranium and the investigation had been closed.

In May 2009, according to a restricted IAEA report (IAEA's Safeguards Implementation Report (SIR) for 2008) obtained by Reuters, the U.N. nuclear watchdog was investigating the discovery of traces of highly enriched uranium (HEU) at a nuclear research facility. The detection was made by the environmental swipe samples taken in 2007 and 2008 at the Nuclear Research Center, which was tested positive for both low enriched uranium (LEU) and highly enriched uranium without confirming whether the (HEU) particles were weapon-grade material.

Egypt accounted for the discovery of (HEU) material that it "could have been brought into the country through contaminated radioisotope transport containers," and the IAEA's inspectors had not verified the source of the particles, and there were no evidence that Egypt's explanation was not correct. Also, the report concludes that earlier issues of undeclared nuclear activities and material reported to the Board of Governors in February 2005, are no longer outstanding and all declared nuclear material remained in peaceful activities.

=== Uranium conversion experiments ===
During December, 2004 and January, 2005 inspections the IAEA found that Egypt failed to declare in the initial report in 1982, a 67 kg of imported uranium tetrafluoride (UF_{4}), 3 kg of imported and domestically produced uranium metal, 9.5 kg of imported thorium compounds, and small amounts of domestically produced uranium dioxide (UO_{2}), uranium trioxide (UO_{3}) and UF_{4} stored in the basement of the Nuclear Chemistry Building at Inshas. Egypt reported that it had imported nuclear material and carried out uranium conversion using that material prior to the force entry of the Safeguards Agreement and granted the agency with access to the Nuclear Chemistry Building where the experiments on the uranium conversion had been conducted within the framework of staff development for the front end of the fuel cycle, and provided a list of the nuclear material that had been imported and the subsequent nuclear material that had been produced, which was unreported in the initial report in 1982.

Egypt notified the Agency that, the Nuclear Material Authority (NMA) had conducted a project to recover uranium ore concentrate as a by-product of activities at the Phosphoric Acid Purification Plant in Inshas but failed to separate uranium. Egypt presented to the agency the program for heap leaching of uranium ore in the Sinai and Eastern deserts and declared that none of the uranium ore concentrate produced as a result of the leaching activities had been of a purity and composition that required to be reported.

=== Uranium and thorium irradiation experiments ===
In December 2004 investigation, Egypt acknowledged that between 1990 and 2003, about 12 unreported experiments to the IAEA performed using a total of 1.15 g of natural uranium compounds and 9 thorium samples had been irradiated and conducted at the ETRR-1 and between 1999 and 2003 about 4 unreported experiments using a total of 0.24 g of natural uranium compounds irradiated at the ETRR-2, these experiments involving the irradiation of small amounts of natural uranium in the reactor to test the production of fission product isotopes for medical purposes and the irradiated compounds had been dissolved in three laboratories located in the Nuclear Chemistry Building with no plutonium or U-233 was separated during these experiments. Egypt provided modified design information for the two reactors and submitted inventory change reports (ICRs). Also, Egypt declared that similar experiments had been conducted between 1982 and 1988, prior the entry of safeguards agreement into force.

=== Activities related to reprocessing ===
In March 2001 and July 2002, the IAEA was investigating on the environmental samples which was taken from the ETRR-1's hot cells that revealed traces of actinides and fission products, which was explained by Egypt in July 2003, that the presence of the particles was attributed by a damaged nuclear fuel cladding resulted in contamination of the reactor water that penetrated the hot cells from irradiated sample cans.

In December 2004, Egypt declared that it failed to include in the initial report, a total gross weight (include cladding and containers) of one kilogram of imported unirradiated fuel rods containing 10% enriched U-235, which was used in experiments involved in laboratory scale testing of fuel dissolution prior to the development of a reprocessing laboratory (Hydrometallurgy Pilot Plant) and presented to the agency one intact fuel rod enriched 10% U-235, a number of pieces of other fuel rods (natural and enriched uranium), and uranyl nitrate solution with uranium enriched 10% U-235. These experiments were conducted at the Nuclear Chemistry Building prior to force entry of the Safeguards Agreement. Egypt had agreed to correct its initial report to include these materials.

Egypt also declared that, at the end of the 1970s, it concluded several contracts with a foreign company to build the Hydrometallurgy Pilot Plant (HPP) and in 1982, laboratory 2 became operational. The Hydrometallurgy Pilot Plant designed for conducting bench scale radiochemistry experiments involving the separation of plutonium and uranium from irradiated fuel elements of the ETRR-1 research reactor. In November 2004 and January 2005, Egypt acknowledged that, in 1987, it had carried out acceptance tests in the HPP using unirradiated uranyl nitrate in chemical reagents purchased on the local market while the uranyl nitrate had been mixed with a solution obtained from the dissolution of domestically produced scrap UO_{2} pellets (with 1.9 kg of uranium compounds). Egypt did not declare it to the IAEA for safeguarding, due to the fact that the facility was never completed and it was designed for bench scale experiments. Egypt had submitted the Hydrometallurgy Pilot Plant design information and had agreed to provide ICRs.

In 2004, Egypt shows the IAEA's inspectors the Radioisotope Production Facility at Inshas, which was a new facility under construction intended for the separation of radioisotopes from enriched 19.7% U-235 irradiated at the ETRR-2 reactor while Egypt should have reported the decision to construct the new facility no later than 1997. Egypt took a corrective measure, and provided the agency with the facility design information.

== See also ==
- Energy in Egypt
