= Hot Laboratory and Waste Management Center =

- Established: 1980
- Research type: Basic nuclear science
- Field of research: Radioactive waste management, nuclear fuel cycle back end analysis and radioisotope production
- Location: Inshas, Egypt
- Operating agency: Egyptian Atomic Energy Authority

The Hot Laboratory and Waste Management Center (HLWMC), is dedicated for radioactive waste disposal as well as development of expertise in the back end of nuclear fuel cycle and radioisotope production for medical and industrial applications. The HLWMC was established in 1980, owned and operated by the Egyptian Atomic Energy Authority (AEA) in Inshas, northeast of Cairo.

== Overview ==
The Hot Laboratory and Waste Management Center (HLWMC) consists of a low and intermediate level liquid waste station, radioisotope production laboratories, and a radioactive waste disposal site. HLWMC contains a French-supplied hot cell complex for plutonium extraction research, which is the only known facility in Egypt that could be used to separate weapons-usable plutonium from irradiated reactor fuel. However, the facility does not contain nuclear materials requiring IAEA safeguards.

== See also ==
- Nuclear program of Egypt
- Egyptian Atomic Energy Authority
- Radioisotope Production Facility
