= Yahya El Mashad =

Egyptian nuclear scientist

- Born: 11 January 1932; Benha, Egypt
- Died: 14 June 1980 (aged 48); Paris, France
- Cause of death: Assassination
- Occupation: Nuclear scientist

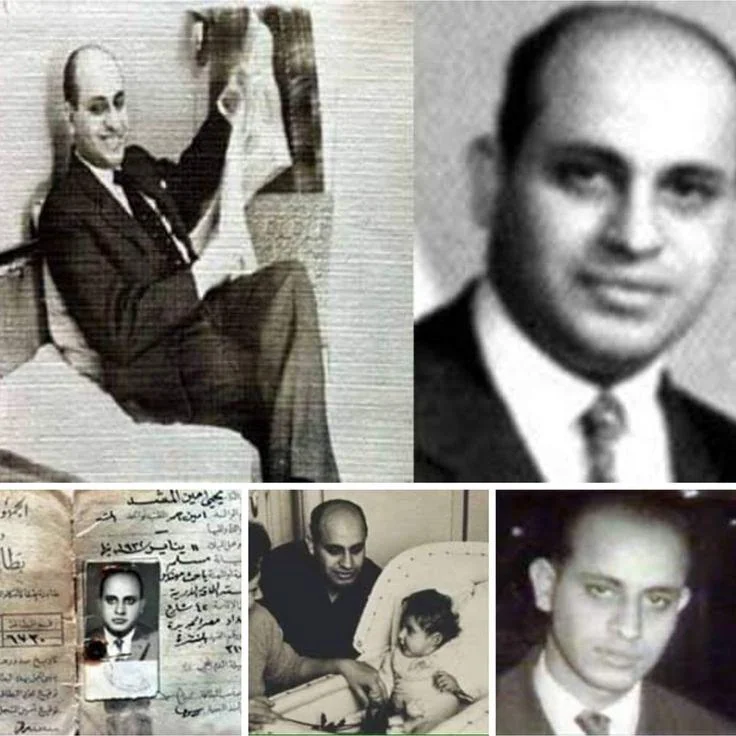

Yahya El Mashad (Arabic: يحيى المشد; 1932 – 14 June 1980) was an Egyptian nuclear scientist who headed the Iraqi nuclear program. He was killed in a Paris hotel room in June 1980, in an operation generally attributed to the Mossad.

== Early life and education ==
El Mashad was born in Benha, Egypt in 1932. He was educated in Tanta and graduated from the Electrical Engineering Department in the Faculty of Engineering at Alexandria University in 1952. Although he traveled to London to gain his doctorate in 1956, due to the Suez Crisis he eventually traveled to Moscow to complete his studies. He spent about six years in the Soviet Union before returning to Egypt in 1964 to accept a professorship in nuclear engineering at Alexandria University.

== Career ==
El Mashad joined the Egyptian Atomic Energy Authority and worked as a nuclear engineer until the Egyptian nuclear program was frozen following the Six-Day War in 1967. He then travelled to Iraq where he led the Iraqi nuclear program, and supervised Iraq's nuclear co-operation agreement with France. In 1980, he refused to receive a uranium shipment as it did not meet the agreed specifications, after which the French insisted on his presence in Paris to receive the shipment.

== Assassination ==
On 14 June 1980, El Mashad was found dead in his room at the Le Méridien hotel in Paris. Some sources state that he was found with his throat cut and multiple stab wounds, others that he had been bludgeoned to death. Weeks later, a Parisian sex worker, alleged to have a connection to Mashad's death, was killed by a hit-and-run automobile. French authorities suspected the Israeli intelligence agency Mossad, but had no proof. Israel issued statements immediately after El Mashad's death, claiming that the Iraqi nuclear program had been set back, but denied involvement.

== Bibliography ==
- Bar-Joseph, Uri; Handel, Michael; Perlmutter, Amos (2003) [1982], Two minutes over Baghdad (2nd ed.), London [u.a.]: Routledge, ISBN 978-0-7146-5422-5
