= El Dabaa Nuclear Power Plant =

Planned nuclear power plant in Egypt

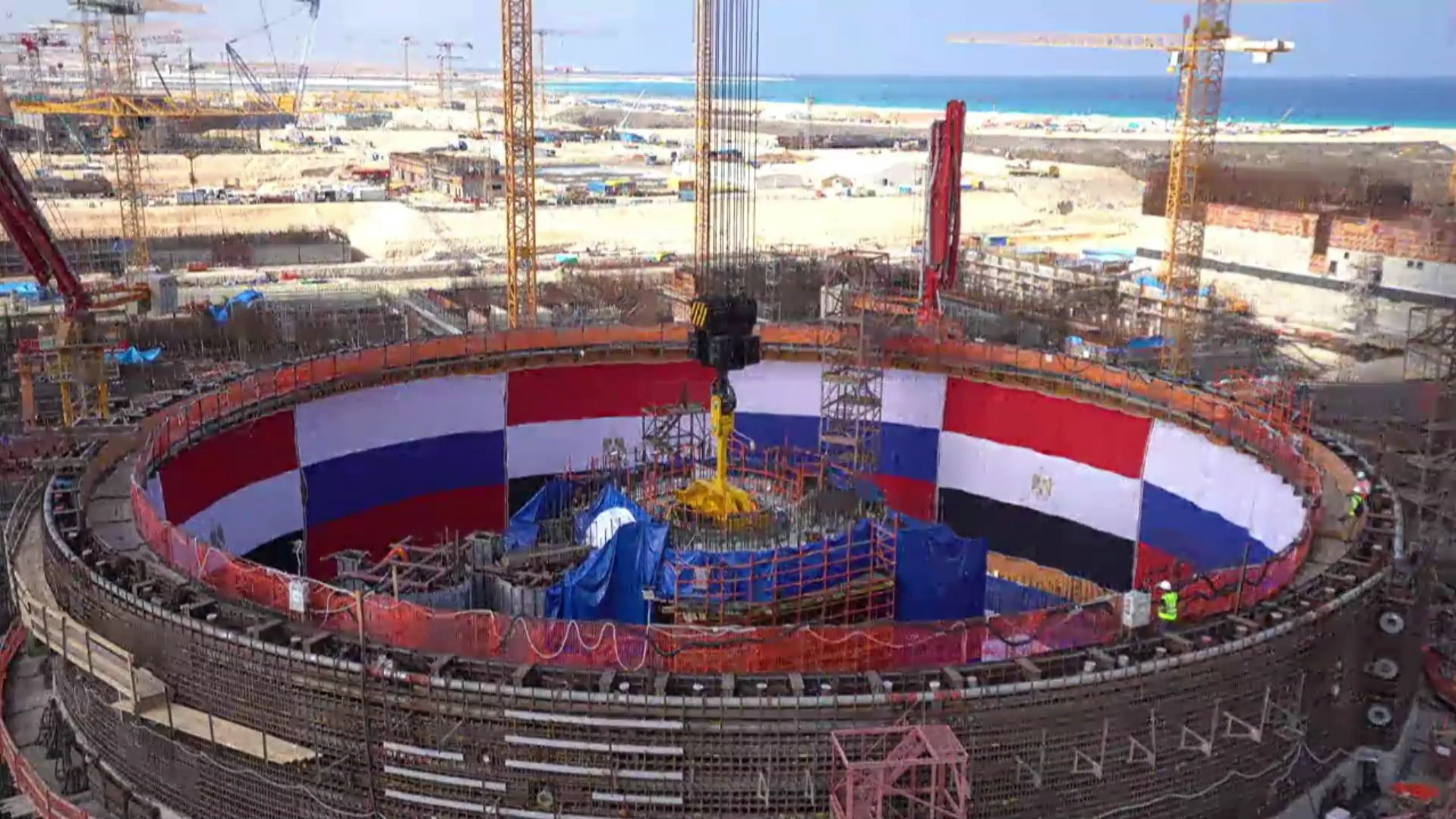
- Official name: محطة الضبعة للطاقة النووية
- Country: Egypt
- Location: El Dabaa, North Coast
- Coordinates: 31°2′39″N 28°29′52″E
- Status: Under construction
- Construction began: July 20, 2022
- Commission date: 2028; 2 years' time (expected)
- Construction cost: US$28.75 billion
- Owner: Nuclear Power Plants Authority

Nuclear power station
- Reactor type: VVER-1200
- Reactor supplier: Rosatom
- Cooling source: Mediterranean Sea

Power generation
- Units under const.: 4 × 1,200 MW
- Nameplate capacity: 4,800 MW

External links
- Website: nppa.gov.eg

El Dabaa Nuclear Power Plant (Egyptian Arabic: محطة الضبعة للطاقة النووية) is an under construction nuclear power plant in El Dabaa, Matrouh Governorate, Egypt, about 320 kilometers northwest of Cairo. It is the first nuclear power plant in Egypt. The plant will have four VVER-1200 reactors, making Egypt the only country in the region to have a Generation III+ reactor.

== History ==
On November 19, 2015, Egypt and Russia signed an initial agreement, under which Russia will build and finance Egypt's first nuclear power plant. In December 2017 preliminary contracts for the construction of four VVER-1200 units were signed in the presence of Egyptian President Abdel Fattah el-Sisi and Russian President Vladimir Putin. Rosatom will build the plant, and supply Russian nuclear fuel for its entire life cycle.

The Nuclear Power Plants Authority (NPPA) submitted applications for construction permits for units 1 and 2 in June 2021, and applications for units 3 and 4 in December 2021. The permit for unit 1 was issued by the Egyptian Nuclear and Radiological Regulatory Authority (ENRRA) in June 2022. First safety-related concrete was poured in July 2022. In October 2022, ENRRA gave construction approval for unit 2, whose construction started on 19 November.

In 2022, Korea Hydro & Nuclear Power was contracted to construct 82 ancillary buildings and structures. Doosan Enerbility was sub-contracted to build the turbine buildings and related structures for about $1.2 billion.

In 2025 welding lasting for 20 days was completed for the upper half of the VVER-1200 reactor vessel for El Dabaa plant, new materials and technologies will help to increase the service life to 100 years.

== Safety Regulations ==
In June 2026, the International Atomic Energy Agency (IAEA) conducted a 12-day Integrated Regulatory Review Service (IRRS) mission in Egypt to evaluate the country’s nuclear and radiation safety regulatory framework. As part of the mission, the review team observed regulatory inspections at the El Dabaa Nuclear Power Plant construction site.

== Finance ==
The project will cost US$28.75 billion of which Russia will finance 85% as a state loan of US$25 billion and Egypt will provide the remaining 15% in the form of installments. The Russian loan has a repayment period of 22 years, with an annual interest rate of 3%.

== Reactor data ==
Unit	Type	Net capacity	Gross capacity	Construction start	First criticality	First grid connection	Commercial operation	Notes
El Dabaa 1	VVER-1200/529	1100 MW	1200 MW	2022-07-20				
El Dabaa 2	VVER-1200/529	1100 MW	1200 MW	2022-11-19				
El Dabaa 3	VVER-1200/529	1100 MW	1200 MW	2023-05-03				
El Dabaa 4	VVER-1200/529	1100 MW	1200 MW	2024-01-23				

== See also ==
- Nuclear program of Egypt
- Egyptian Atomic Energy Authority
- Energy in Egypt
- List of commercial nuclear reactors § Egypt
- Bushehr Nuclear Power Plant, Iran
- Akkuyu Nuclear Power Plant, Türkiye
- Barakah nuclear power plant, UAE
