= Nuclear power in Indonesia =

Nuclear reactors in Indonesia (view)
Research Reactors
Possible locations for a power plant

The program for nuclear power in Indonesia includes plans to build nuclear reactors in the country for peaceful purposes. Indonesia prohibited development of nuclear weapon or any offensive uses due to signing the Treaty on the Non-Proliferation of Nuclear Weapons on 2 March 1970 and ratified it as Law No. 8/1978 on 18 December 1978.

The current legislation regulating the utilization, research, and development of nuclear power in Indonesia is Law No. 10/1997. With this law, the national nuclear energy regulatory and oversight agency, Badan Pengawas Tenaga Nuklir (BAPETEN, English: Nuclear Energy Regulatory Agency), was founded in 1998. While National Nuclear Energy Agency of Indonesia (Indonesian: Badan Tenaga Nuklir Nasional, BATAN) was the state nuclear research and development agency established in 1958 and revitalized through the law. Prior the 2021 science and technology reformation, BATAN took role as the state nuclear research and development agency. Since 2021, National Research and Innovation Agency (Indonesian: Badan Riset dan Inovasi Nasional, BRIN) is the state nuclear research and development agency after BATAN relinquished its power and rights to BRIN and liquidation of BATAN. BRIN exercise its role in execution of state nuclear research and development activities through its Research Organization for Nuclear Energy (Indonesian: Organisasi Riset Tenaga Nuklir, ORTN).

== History ==
In 1954, research on atomic energy began in Indonesia. Apart from producing electricity, nuclear technology is also used for medical and agricultural purposes and for food safety. Plans for an atomic program were scaled back in 1997 due to the discovery of the Natuna gas field but have since revived since 2005.

According to Presidential Decree Five in 2006, Indonesia should have four nuclear-power plants built by 2025. Their total capacity will be at least 4,000 MW of electricity, about 1.96 percent of projected electricity demand in 2025 (200,000 to 350,000 MW). Indonesia has stated that the program will be developed in accordance with the International Atomic Energy Agency (IAEA), and Mohammed ElBaradei was invited to visit the country in December 2006. Protests against plans for nuclear power were held in June 2007 in central Java, and increased in mid-2007.

In December 2013 it was reported that Indonesia was planning to begin constructing a reactor in 2015. In February 2014 the Indonesian Government confirmed that it was planning to construct a 30MW reactor in the near future. However, as of December 2015, Indonesia will not resort to nuclear energy to meet its target of 136.7 gigawatt of power capacity by 2025 and 430 gigawatt by 2050.

In August 2016, China Nuclear Engineering Corporation and BATAN agreed to jointly develop a HTGR in Indonesia.

On 1 September 2021, BATAN dissolved and replaced by ORTN of BRIN.

== Indonesia and International Nuclear co-operation ==
Indonesia is a member of the IAEA, and a signatory to the NPT.

=== Comprehensive Nuclear-Test-Ban Treaty ===
On 6 December 2011 the Indonesian Parliament ratified the Comprehensive Nuclear-Test-Ban Treaty (CTBT). Indonesia agreed not to conduct nuclear-weapons testing, but nuclear power plants are unaffected.

=== Cooperation with other countries ===
In 2006 Indonesia signed treaties for nuclear cooperation with a number of countries, including South Korea, Russia, Australia and the United States. Australia has indicated its willingness to supply Indonesia with uranium for peaceful purposes. A well-publicized agreement with a Russian company to build a floating nuclear reactor in Gorontalo ran aground; Indonesia has since made it clear that it wants a higher-capacity nuclear power plant, and will construct a land-based plant. In mid-2014, BATAN and Russia's state-owned Rosatom have signed an agreement for developing the (30MW) Indonesia's first nuclear power plant.

=== IAEA appraisal ===
The International Atomic Energy Agency (IAEA) considers Indonesia ready to develop nuclear energy in a statement issued in November 2009. Its appraisal considered four readiness aspects: human resources, stakeholders, industry and regulations. The Indonesian Nuclear Board (BATAN) has carried out research since the 1980s.

== Reactor locations ==
For research purposes, the following experimental nuclear reactors have already been built in Indonesia:

1. Kartini nuclear research reactor in Sleman, Yogyakarta
2. MPR RSG-GA Siwabessy nuclear research reactor in Serpong, Banten
3. Triga Mark III nuclear research reactor in Bandung, West Java

There are 28 potential locations for nuclear power plant. Locations in Sumatra and Java has been proposed for large nuclear power plant, while other locations have been proposed for small modular reactor. Several locations have been proposed for nuclear reactors to generate electricity:

1. Cape Muria, Kudus (Central Java)
2. Gorontalo, in northern Sulawesi
3. Bangka Belitung (two plants with a total capacity of 18 GW)
4. Kalimantan (East and West)
5. Banten

According to an observer, Indonesia is capable of building a nuclear reactor in every province due to ample materials and geological support. As a tin-mining area, monazite exists throughout Bangka and Belitung island. Nearly 183 tons of monazite sediment was found in Mount Muntai, sufficient for nuclear power plants which will be built in West and South Bangka.

BATAN continues searching for uranium sources and suitable sites for nuclear power plants. Bangka Belitung is geologically stable and near the country's greatest electricity-consuming regions: Java and Sumatra. Local residents are more receptive to hosting a nuclear power plant, compared with other locations. Although local residents were opposed, BATAN was still considering the previously studied locations of Mount Muria, Jepara, Central Java and Serang, Banten.

In July 2011, the Bangka Belitung governor requested the government to continue its plans for nuclear power plants in the Muntok and Permis areas between 2025 and 2030. The two plants will produce two gigawatts of electricity at a cost of Rp 70 trillion ($8.2 billion), producing 40 percent of electricity needs in Sumatra, Java and Bali.

Concerning the Fukushima accident, an Indonesian geodesics lecturer stated that while most of Japan was earthquake-prone, Indonesia has many quake-free areas in Kalimantan, Bangka-Belitung, northern Java (a populous area) and Western New Guinea

== Proposals ==
A physics lecturer from Airlangga University has stated that the need for electricity continues to increase, while fossil-fuel reserves are being depleted; Indonesia is ready and able to develop a nuclear-power plant. Nuclear experts have conducted nuclear research since the 1970s. The Indonesian Nuclear Energy Regulation Agency BAPETEN has confirmed that seven nuclear supervisors were on IAEA missions in several countries (including one in Tokyo, Japan), and Indonesia is ready to operate nuclear power plants as soon as those facilities are built.

Despite the Fukushima nuclear disaster, Indonesia is unlikely to halt its plan to build its first nuclear-power plant due to an electricity crisis. A nuclear-energy development head at Indonesia's National Nuclear Energy Agency said that concerns about a disaster such as Japan's were misplaced; plants in Indonesia would use more advanced technology than the four-decade-old reactors at the Fukushima plant in Japan. Modern plants are designed to operate in the circumstances of total power failure like that experienced at Fukushima, relying on passive safety systems that do not require electricity to function.

P3Tek, an agency within the department of energy, has recommended the TMSR-500 molten salt reactor described in ThorCon nuclear reactor. Indonesia nuclear regulator BAPETEN and ThorCon began pre-licensing consultation in March 2023. In July 2023 Indonesia regulator BAPETEN led a public discussion of the planned ThorCon fission power plant at Gelasa Island.

ThorCon submitted the nuclear power plant proposal to the Indonesian government on 11 September 2024. If approved, a 250 MW power plant will be built and operated on 2032.

== Natural resources ==
Indonesia has at least two uranium mines: the Remaja-Hitam and Rirang-Tanah Merah mines, located in western Kalimantan (Borneo). If these prove insufficient, the country may import uranium.

The latest 2022 ORTN estimate predicted that Indonesia has 90,000 tonnes of uranium reserves (from hypothetic category to definite category) and 150,000 tonnes thorium reserves (all in hypothetic category). Mostly Uranium found in West Kalimantan and the rest in Papua, Bangka Belitung and West Sulawesi, while Thorium found mostly in Bangka Belitung and the rest in West Kalimantan. In Mamuju Regency, West Sulawesi, Uranium is detected about 100–1.500 ppm (part per million) and Thorium about 400–1.800 ppm. Singkep district, Mamuju Regency has the highest Gamma Radiation in Indonesia.

To commercialize the uranium and other radioactive materials, first parliament should amend the Law No. 10/1997 on Nuclear Energy which does not allow domestic or foreign investors to exploit radioactive resources for commercial purposes (just for research purposes). However, for 25 years after the law passed, not much significant development on exploration and exploitation of nuclear mineral resources in Indonesia by Indonesian companies. On end of 2022, Joko Widodo signed two key documents, Government Regulation No. 42/2022 on 1 November 2022 and Government Regulation No. 52/2022 on 8 December 2022, enabling exploration and exploitation of nuclear minerals by Indonesian companies and foreign companies. Russia reported to be interested to invest in this industry after the issuance of the regulations.

== Controversy ==
Indonesia's nuclear plans have met with criticism from Greenpeace, other groups and individuals. In June 2007 nearly 4,200 protesters rallied in Central Java, calling on the government to abandon plans to build a nuclear power plant in their area. Specific concerns included the dangers posed by nuclear waste and the location of the country on the Pacific Ring of Fire, with geological activity (such as earthquakes and volcanic eruptions) hazardous to nuclear reactors.

== See also ==
- Energy in Indonesia
- Indonesia and weapons of mass destruction
- List of commercial nuclear reactors
- List of small modular reactor designs
- Nuclear power by country
- Small modular reactor
- Thorium-based nuclear power
- World Nuclear Industry Status Report

== Sources ==
- Nuclear Power Development in Indonesia by Soedyartomo Soentono, National Atomic Energy Agency, Indonesia.
- Indonesian Policy on the Development and Utilization of Nuclear Energy by M. Hatta Rajasa, State Minister for Research and Technology, Republic of Indonesia.
- Paper from 2003 that includes organograms of BAPETEN an BATAN
