= Egypt and weapons of mass destruction =

Egypt had a history of weapons of mass destruction and used chemical weapons during the North Yemen Civil War. Although it has signed the Nuclear Non-Proliferation Treaty, it still remains one of only four countries not to ratify the Chemical Weapons Convention and has not ratified the Biological Weapons Convention.

According to authors Gordon M. Burck and Charles C. Flowerree, cited by M. Zuhair Diab, Egypt provided Syria with chemical artillery shells in 1973 as a military deterrent against Israel before they both launched the October War. Syria later developed its own chemical weapons program.

== Chemical weapons program ==
Egypt's chemical weapons program is the most developed of its pursuit of developing a weapons of mass destruction program though it is thought this reached its peak in the 1960s. It also used chemical weapons during the North Yemeni Civil War. Phosgene and mustard gas were used against Royalist forces and civilians in Northern Yemen.

Egypt has maintained a policy of not signing the Chemical Weapons Convention until questions regarding Israel's nuclear weapons program are answered.

=== Use of chemical weapons during the North Yemeni Civil War ===
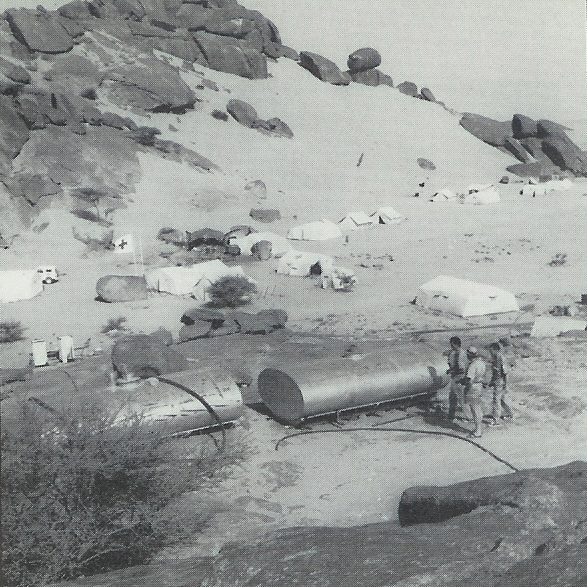
The International Red Cross hospital at Uqd.

The first use of gas took place on June 8, 1963, against Kawma, a village of about 100 inhabitants in North Yemen, killing about seven people and damaging the eyes and lungs of twenty-five others. This incident is considered to have been experimental, and the bombs were described as "home-made, amateurish and relatively ineffective". The Egyptian authorities suggested that the reported incidents were probably caused by napalm, not gas. The Israeli Foreign Minister, Golda Meir, suggested in an interview that Nasser would not hesitate to use gas against Israel as well. There were no reports of gas during 1964, and only a few were reported in 1965. The reports grew more frequent in late 1966. On December 11, 1966, fifteen gas bombs killed two people and injured thirty-five. On January 5, 1967, the biggest gas attack came against the village of Kitaf, causing 270 casualties, including 140 fatalities. The target may have been Prince Hassan bin Yahya, who had installed his headquarters nearby. The Egyptian government denied using poison gas, and alleged that Britain and the US were using the reports as psychological warfare against Egypt. On February 12, 1967, it said it would welcome a UN investigation. On March 1, U Thant said he was "powerless" to deal with the matter.

On May 10, the twin villages of Gahar and Gadafa in Wadi Hirran, where Prince Mohamed bin Mohsin was in command, were gas bombed, killing at least seventy-five. The Red Cross was alerted and on June 2, it issued a statement in Geneva expressing concern. The Institute of Forensic Medicine at the University of Berne made a statement, based on a Red Cross report, that the gas was likely to have been halogenous derivatives - phosgene, mustard gas, lewisite, chloride or cyanogen bromide. The gas attacks stopped for three weeks after the Six-Day War of June, but resumed in July, against all parts of royalist Yemen. Casualty estimates vary, and an assumption, considered conservative, is that the mustard and phosgene-filled aerial bombs caused approximately 1,500 fatalities and 1,500 injuries.

== Nuclear weapons program ==
Egypt is not known to have pursued a dedicated nuclear weapons program since the Egyptian Revolution of 1952. It began its nuclear program in 1954 which expanded to include Russian 2MW nuclear research reactor ETRR-1 that was opened by President Gamal Abdel-Nasser at Inchass in 1961. Further development in its nuclear program was stopped in 1967 after the Six Day War.

In addition, in 1992 Egypt acquired a more powerful 22MW multi-purpose research reactor ETRR-2 from Argentina.

Egypt signed the Nuclear Non-Proliferation Treaty in 1968, which it did not ratify until 1981. It has since 1974 worked to make North Africa, West Asia and the Mediterranean a nuclear weapons free zone.

At the time of the 1973 October War, Egypt was reported by Aviation Week to have hosted Soviet crewed and controlled nuclear Scud surface to surface missiles to provide a local nuclear deterrent as part of its preparations to attack nuclear armed Israel.

== Biological weapons program ==
Egypt signed the Biological and Toxin Weapons Convention (BWC) on 10 April 1972, but has not ratified it.

Prior to signing the BWC, Egyptian President Anwar Sadat made the following comment to a question about Israel and should they use biological weapons.

"The only reply to biological warfare is that we too should use biological warfare. I believe that the density of the Israeli population confined in a small area would provide the opportunity to reply with the same weapon if they should begin using it. Briefly, we have the instruments of biological warfare in the refrigerators and we will not use them unless they begin to use them."
