= Materials testing reactor =

High-flux research nuclear reactor

A materials testing reactor (MTR) is a high-flux research nuclear reactor aimed at studying materials exposed to a high neutron flux.

== United States ==
The first Materials Testing Reactor (MTR), was designed jointly by Oak Ridge National Laboratory and Argonne National Laboratory and operated in Idaho from 1952-1970.

== Other Examples ==
Materials testing reactors include:

- BR2, the Belgian Reactor 2, moderated with a paraboloid beryllium matrix, in operation at SCK CEN since 1962.
- Dounreay Materials Testing Reactor, a Dido class reactor in the United Kingdom.
- ETRR-2, at the nuclear research center in Inshas, Egypt.
- Jules Horowitz Reactor, under construction at the Cadarache nuclear facility in southern France.
- Research reactor in Petten, the Netherlands.
- Pakistan Institute of Nuclear Science & Technology (PINSTECH) in Pakistan.
- Reactor Technology Complex of the Idaho National Laboratory in Idaho, United States.
- RV-1 nuclear reactor in Venezuelan Institute for Scientific Research, Venezuela.
- SAFARI-1, outside of Pretoria, South Africa, also used to produce medical isotopes.
- RSG G.A Siwabessy in Serpong, Indonesia
- Japan Material Testing Reactor (1968 to 2021).
- Washington State University Reactor (1961 to 1967)

== See also ==
- List of nuclear reactors
- Nuclear research reactors
