= G. A. Siwabessy =

Indonesian politician (1914–1982)

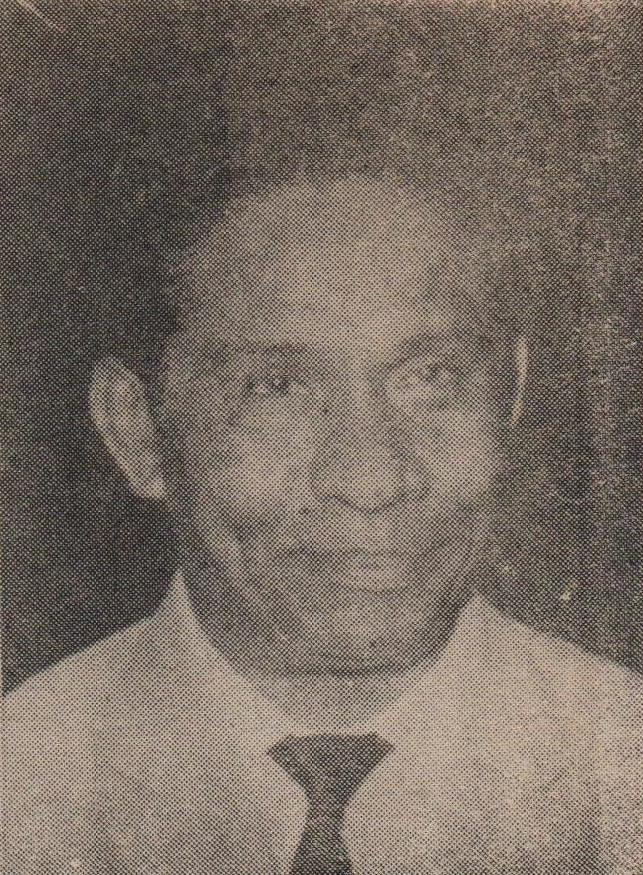
- Official portrait, c. 1973
- President: Sukarno; Suharto

1st Head of the National Atomic Research Agency
- In office 1964–1973
- Succeeded by: Achmad Baiquni

9th Minister of Health
- In office 25 July 1966 – 29 March 1978
- Preceded by: Satrio
- Succeeded by: Suwardjono

Personal details
- Born: 19 August 1914 Ullath, Dutch East Indies
- Died: 11 November 1982 (aged 68) Jakarta, Indonesia
- Party: Indonesian Socialist Party
- Relations: Baby Huwae (niece)

Gerrit Augustinus Siwabessy (19 August 1914 – 11 November 1982) was an Indonesian politician who served as the ninth Minister of Health from July 1966 until March 1978, during the presidencies of Sukarno and Suharto.

== Early life ==
Gerrit Augustinus Siwabessy was born to clove farmers Enoch Siwabessy and Naatje Manuhutu in Saparua, a small island in central Maluku within the vicinity of Ambon. Enoch Siwabessy died when his son was one year old; his widow then married Jacob Leuwol, an elementary school teacher. Because Leuwol was a teacher, Siwabessy and his family enjoyed a higher social status on a par with pastors and priests while he attended elementary and middle school. Siwabessy graduated from high school (MULO) in Kota Ambon in 1931, where his grades were high enough to earn a scholarship funded by the government of the Dutch East Indies to NIAS (Dutch Indies Medical School) in Surabaya on Java. He studied alongside a highly multiethnic body of Indonesian students that, among others, included Ibnu Sutowo; this exposure to multiculturalism shaped his perspective to include Ambonese matters with respect to the nation at large where he had previously only considered the island of Ambon itself.

During Siwabessy's first years as an undergraduate, he attended a conference of the local Studenten Vereniging Christen (Christian Student Association) which took place in Kaliurang, a small town within the vicinity of Yogyakarta. His experiences helped him form ideas about how to design an Ambonese-oriented version of the association. Alongside Jo Picauly, a fellow medical student in Jakarta, Siwabessy created the Vereniging Ambonsche Studenten (VAS; Association of Ambonese Students) with two chapters; he led the VAS chapter in Surabaya. However, because not many Ambonese resided in Surabaya at the time, the club held little more than minor festivities. During the later years of his studies, Siwabessy created a more substantial organisation called Memadjoekan Cultuur Maloekoe or MCM ("Advancement of the Moluccan Culture") in 1938. The premise of the association was to provide a means of cultural unity for Moluccan students experiencing "a nomadic nostalgia, an urge for identity or personality".

== Soekarno Era ==
Siwabessy was a candidate for the House of Representatives in the 1955 Indonesian legislative election representing the Socialist Party of Indonesia, but he was not elected.

In 1958, the Institute of Atomic Energy (Lembaga Tenaga Atom, LTA) was established by the Indonesian government to supervise nuclear research and develop atomic energy. The LTA was limited to conducting peaceful research, including the planning and construction of reactors in cooperation with the United States and the Soviet Union.

Recognizing the growing strategic importance of nuclear weapons, Sukarno reorganized and renamed the agency as the National Atomic Energy Agency (Badan Tenaga Atom Nasional, BATAN). Although the idea of developing a nuclear weapon was eventually abandoned, BATAN was renamed to National Nuclear Energy Agency (Badan Tenaga Nuklir Nasional, BATAN) and continued to serve as the country's main national nuclear research agency during Soekarno Era. Siwabessy was appointed as the inaugural Head of the National Atomic Research Agency and related to Indonesia and weapons of mass destruction.

== Suharto era ==
In 1965, several military officials comprising the 30 September Movement attempted a coup that led to the kidnappings and assassinations of major army officials (including Minister of the Army Ahmad Yani), and to a leadership vacuum in the army headquarters. President Sukarno chose Major General Suharto to launch operations against the 30 September Movement. The operation's success led Sukarno to broaden the scope of Suharto's measures in handling security, formalised with the creation of Kopkamtib ("Operational Command for the Restoration of Security and Order"). Suharto, now the leader of Indonesia's army, gradually siphoned Sukarno's power towards himself, an action emphasised with the passing of the Supersemar decree. At the time, between June 1966 and May 1967, Siwabessy engaged in an "internal cleansing operation" to remove all elements of the Communist Party from the Ministry of Health and ensure that the Ministry's officials and employees adhered to Suharto's Pancasila ideology. These cleansings were so effective that Suharto allowed Siwabessy to remain as Minister of Health in the wake of the turmoil of Suharto's newfound presidency.

Once Suharto was officially recognised as president, Siwabessy was tasked with rebuilding Indonesian relations with international health organisations. He met with members of the United Nations, which Indonesia had joined in 1967, and coordinated with UNICEF to establish an Applied Nutrition Program in Indonesia, training people in nutritional science through Indonesian and American experts. He also worked with the World Health Organization (WHO) with the intention of eradicating infectious diseases rampant in the country, and joined Indonesia to the Smallpox Global Eradication Programme in 1967. Siwabessy launched a campaign that actively fought smallpox two years later, and systematically eradicated it from Indonesia over the six following years. WHO recognised him in 1974 for his successes.

Using foreign funds, Siwabessy modernised a series of medical facilities, prompting the construction of a medical laboratory at Hasan Sadikin Hospital in Bandung; the introduction of intensive care units at Dr. Cipto Mangunkusumo Hospital in Jakarta and in the Floating Hospital in Maluku; and the modernisation of facilities and equipment at hospitals in Semarang and Navan. Siwabessy also began developing the concept of puskesmas, a community health centre that would become prominent in Indonesia's rural regions. Between 22 and 29 April 1968, Siwabessy held the Rapat Kerja Kesehatan Nasional ("National Healthcare Meeting") that yielded designs for Repelita (Indonesian: Rencana Pembangunan Lima Tahun; English: Five-Year Development Plan) that was applied to healthcare in Indonesia. Siwabessy commissioned the creation of a special planning committee led by Sulianti Saroso, and created education programs at the National Health Institute in Surabaya and at the Health Development Agency in Jakarta to train people to plan in the context of applying development to solve healthcare issues. He arranged for employees of the Ministry of Health and local governments to study abroad. One month after the health conference, Suharto replaced the Sukarno-era Ampera Cabinet with the Development Cabinet. Siwabessy was reappointed Minister of Health in the first of Suharto's cabinets. Before the events associated with Repelita I ended, Suharto was re-elected as president in 1972. He appointed Siwabessy to office for a third term between 1973 and 1978.

In 1975, Siwabessy initiated Repelita II. Having developed the skilled labour necessary during the first Repelita, the second aimed to eradicated infectious diseases, enact stricter drug and food control laws, establish health education programs, improve the nutrition of Indonesia's residents, augment Indonesia's physical infrastructure, and further train and more efficiently use health personnel in the country. Under Repelita II, Puskesmas (community health clinics) and other health centres were constructed all across Indonesia. The development of the Samijaga program (Indonesian: Sarana Air Minum dan Jamban Keluarga, English: "Drinking water and family lavatories") led to widespread accessibility to water uncontaminated by feces. Together, the Repelita programs and Samijaga demonstrated Siwabessy's ability to create and successfully implement policies on health, earning him another WHO award.

== Awards and recognition ==
Siwabessy garnered a reputation as the "Father of the Atom" (Indonesian: Bapak Atom), for his work in radiology, and was awarded the Bintang Mahaputera Utama—the third order of the most prestigious award an Indonesian civilian can receive—by the government of Indonesia, he is also Minister of the National Atomic Energy Agency during Soekarno Era when Nuclear Weapon project. A nuclear reactor in Tangerang is named for him.

== Bibliography ==
- Wasisto, Broto; et al. (2009). Sejarah Pembangunan Kesehatan Indonesia 1973–2009. Jakarta: Kementrian Kesehatan Republik Indonesia. ISBN 978-9799254924.
- Siwabessy, G.A. (1979). Upuleru. Jakarta: PT Gunung Agung.
