= El Dabaa =

El Dabaa الضبعه
- Town
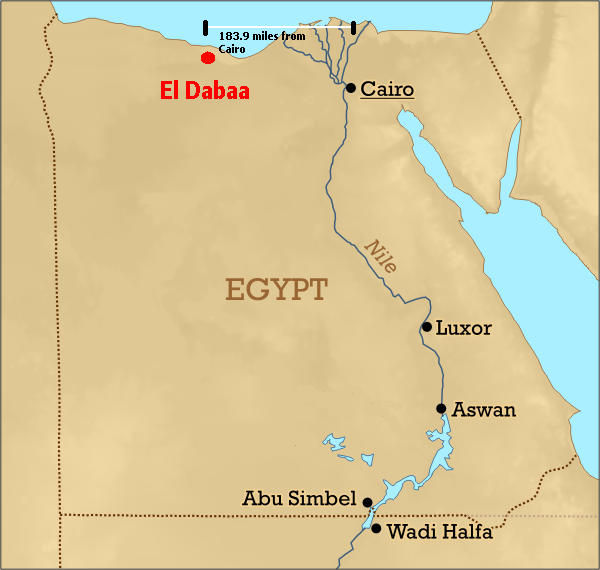
- Country: Egypt
- Governorate: Matrouh

Area
  - Total: 78.3 km^{2} (30.2 sq mi)

Population (2023)
  - Total: 30,332
  - Density: 387/km^{2} (1,000/sq mi)
- Time zone: UTC+2 (EET)
  - Summer (DST): UTC+3 (EEST)

El Dabaa (Egyptian Arabic: الضبعه pronounced [edˈdɑbʕɑ]) is a town in the Matrouh Governorate, Egypt. It lies 296 kilometres (184 mi) from Cairo on the north coast and is served by the El Alamain International Airport. El Dabaa Nuclear Power Plant is located north east of the city.

In 2023, El Dabaa had an estimated population of 30,332.

== El Dabaa Nuclear Project ==
In 2012, a story published in the news section of Nature Journal website, stated that:"... [radioactive] material was taken from a laboratory at the El Dabaa nuclear power plant on the country's Mediterranean coast." But as of 2020, the El Dabaa nuclear power plant was only bare land. As of 2017, only the first stage of preliminary engineering survey was conducted and the hydrographic and hydrological survey work was carried on. Construction on the plant was expected to start in 2020; it eventually started in mid-2022.

Protesters have targeted El Dabaa claiming that their land was wrongly taken by the government to make way for the nuclear plant. As a result of those protests, the proposed construction site was shut down. The protests targeting El Dabaa ended in 2012 when residents were compensated.

On 7 November 2013 Egyptian President Adly Mansour announced that the nuclear power program would be restarted. On 14 November 2013, a spokesman for the electricity ministry, Aktham Abouelela, stated that the tender to build the reactor will begin in January 2014, though it has been delayed until the end of 2014. The first target year for operation was 2019; the plant would be used for 60 years and function as a light water reactor with a capacity of 950 to 1,650 megawatts.

In November 2015 and March 2017, Egypt signed preliminary agreements with Russian nuclear company Rosatom for a first VVER-1200 unit to start in 2024. In November 2017, preliminary contracts for the construction of four VVER-1200 units were signed in the presence of Egyptian President Abdel Fattah el-Sisi and Russian President Vladimir Putin.

The first concrete was poured on 1 July 2022. The four units are being built almost concurrently and the new target date to be fully operational is 2030.

== Climate ==
Köppen-Geiger climate classification system classifies its climate as hot desert (BWh), but it is highly moderated by its proximity to the Mediterranean Sea along the northern coast of Egypt.

Climate data for El Dabaa
Month	Jan	Feb	Mar	Apr	May	Jun	Jul	Aug	Sep	Oct	Nov	Dec	Year
Record high °C (°F)	28.6 (83.5)	30.9 (87.6)	38.2 (100.8)	43.2 (109.8)	47.1 (116.8)	46.8 (116.2)	39.0 (102.2)	41.8 (107.2)	40.0 (104.0)	37.7 (99.9)	32.6 (90.7)	28.3 (82.9)	47.1 (116.8)
Mean daily maximum °C (°F)	17.8 (64.0)	18.7 (65.7)	20.4 (68.7)	23.6 (74.5)	26 (79)	28.5 (83.3)	29.4 (84.9)	30 (86)	28.9 (84.0)	26.7 (80.1)	23.2 (73.8)	19.7 (67.5)	24.4 (75.9)
Daily mean °C (°F)	12.8 (55.0)	13.7 (56.7)	15 (59)	17.8 (64.0)	20.6 (69.1)	23.8 (74.8)	25.4 (77.7)	25.8 (78.4)	24.5 (76.1)	22 (72)	18.2 (64.8)	14.4 (57.9)	19.5 (67.1)
Mean daily minimum °C (°F)	7.8 (46.0)	8.1 (46.6)	9.7 (49.5)	12.1 (53.8)	14.6 (58.3)	18.2 (64.8)	20.7 (69.3)	21 (70)	19.5 (67.1)	16.6 (61.9)	13 (55)	9.3 (48.7)	14.2 (57.6)
Record low °C (°F)	0.9 (33.6)	2.8 (37.0)	3.1 (37.6)	5.6 (42.1)	8.4 (47.1)	11.6 (52.9)	14.5 (58.1)	15.6 (60.1)	13.7 (56.7)	11.4 (52.5)	7.4 (45.3)	1.8 (35.2)	0.9 (33.6)
Average precipitation mm (inches)	32 (1.3)	18 (0.7)	8 (0.3)	2 (0.1)	2 (0.1)	1 (0.0)	0 (0)	0 (0)	1 (0.0)	12 (0.5)	15 (0.6)	28 (1.1)	119 (4.7)
Average precipitation days (≥ 1.0 mm)	3.4	1.4	1.0	0.4	0.1	0.0	0.0	0.0	0.1	1.0	1.3	2.6	11.3
Average relative humidity (%)	67	65	67	64	66	67	69	69	66	65	64	64	66.1
Mean monthly sunshine hours	200.7	205.4	255.7	279.4	317.3	356.4	374.0	354.9	313.8	274.9	228.0	205.0	3,365.5
Source 1: NOAA
Source 2: Climate Charts
