= Nuclear Energy Regulatory Agency =

- Badan Pengawas Tenaga Nuklir
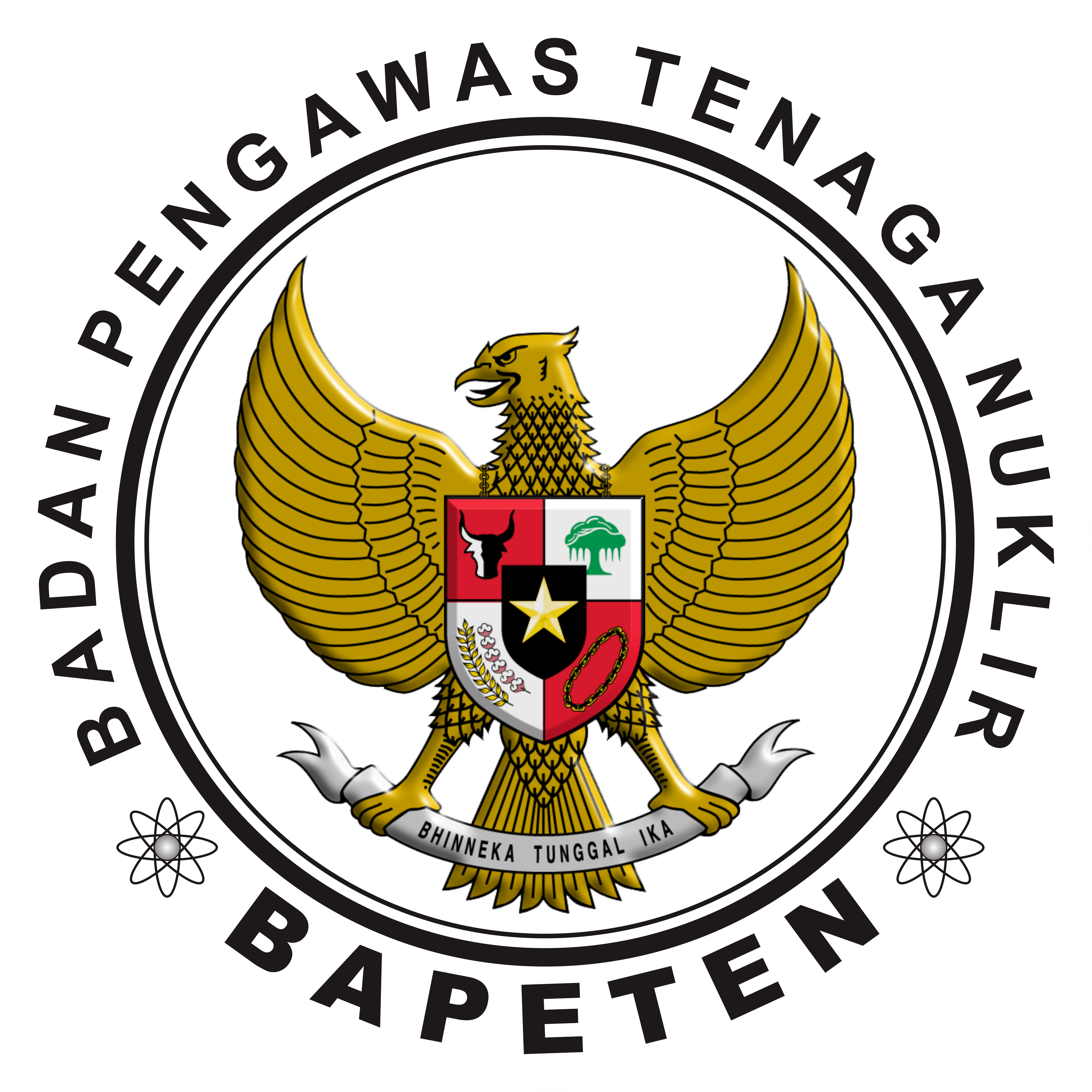

Agency overview
- Formed: 4 January 1999
- Headquarters: Jakarta
- Agency executive: Sugeng Sumbarjo, Acting Chairman
- Website: www.bapeten.go.id

The Nuclear Energy Regulatory Agency (Indonesian: Badan Pengawas Tenaga Nuklir, BAPETEN) is an Indonesian non-Ministerial Government Institution (LPNK) which is under and responsible to the President.

== History ==
=== 1954 - 1958 ===
State Committee for the Investigation of Radioactivity

The establishment of this committee was based on the many nuclear tests carried on in the 1950s by several countries, especially the United States, in different regions of the Pacific, that have given rise to the concerns of radioactive material falling in parts of Indonesia.

The task of this committee was to investigate the effect of nuclear testing, overseeing the use of nuclear energy, and providing annual reports to the government.

=== 1958 - 1964 ===
Atomic Energy Agency

The task of the Atomic Energy Agency was to conduct research in the field of nuclear power and to supervise the use of nuclear energy in Indonesia.

=== 1964 - 1997 ===
National Nuclear Energy Agency (BATAN)

BATAN’s task was to carry out nuclear energy research and supervise the use of nuclear energy in Indonesia. Supervision of nuclear energy usage was carried out by units under BATAN, the last of such unit was the Atomic Energy Control Bureau (BPTA).

In 2010, PT BatanTek (currently PT INUKI), a commercial company under BATAN, discontinued the high grades of radioisotopes due to International regulation.

Now, PT BatanTek produces low grade radioisotope with its technique (electro plating) and is the only one in Asia to produce low grade radioisotope which is useful for 3D radiology imaging.

The half-life of low grade radioisotope is relatively short and will be near zero in 60 hours, so Asia is a captive market for PT BatanTek.

=== 1997 - present ===
Nuclear Energy Regulatory Agency (BAPETEN)

National legislation, through Law Act No. 10/1997 on nuclear energy, has provided for the Nuclear Energy Control Board (BAPETEN) to carry out oversight functions against the use of nuclear energy, which includes licensing, inspection and enforcement of regulations.

The Nuclear energy Act also requires the separation between the regulatory body, i.e. BAPETEN, and the research agency, i.e. BATAN.

== Duties ==
BAPETEN has the tasks of implementing the surveillance of all activities of the use of nuclear energy in Indonesia through regulation, licensing and inspection in accordance with applicable laws and regulations.

== See also ==
- Nuclear power in Indonesia
- International Atomic Energy Agency (IAEA)
- National Nuclear Energy Agency (Badan Tenaga Nuklir Nasional, BATAN)
- Research Organization for Nuclear Energy (Organisasi Riset Tenaga Nuklir, ORTN)
- National Research and Innovation Agency (Badan Riset dan Inovasi Nasional, BRIN)
