= Myanmar and weapons of mass destruction =

Republic of the Union of Myanmar
- Nuclear program start date: 2009 (presumed)
- First nuclear weapon test: Unknown
- First thermonuclear weapon test: Unknown
- Last nuclear test: Unknown
- Largest yield test: Unknown
- Total tests: Unknown
- Peak stockpile: Unknown
- Current stockpile: Unknown
- Deployed warheads: Unknown
- Total deployed warhead megatonnage: Unknown
- Maximum missile range: Unknown
- NPT party: Yes

In 2009, it was reported that Myanmar (formerly known as Burma) was suspected to have initiated a nuclear weapons program. If such a program does exist, Myanmar's technical and financial limitations may make it difficult for the program to succeed. The United States expressed concern in 2011 about potential violations of the Treaty on the Non-Proliferation of Nuclear Weapons (NPT), though by 2012 these concerns had been "partially allayed".

Myanmar has faced persistent accusations of using chemical weapons; however, the NTI has stated there is "no evidence to suggest that Myanmar has a chemical weapons program." Myanmar is a member of nuclear, but not chemical or biological, non-proliferation treaties.

== Nuclear weapons ==
In 2007, Russia and Myanmar made a controversial nuclear research centre deal. According to them, "The centre will comprise a 10 MW light-water reactor working on 20%-enriched uranium-235, an activation analysis laboratory, a medical isotope production laboratory, silicon doping system, nuclear waste treatment and burial facilities".

According to an August 2009 report published in the Sydney Morning Herald, Myanmar had been working to develop a nuclear weapon by 2014. The reported effort, purportedly being undertaken with assistance from North Korea, involves the construction of a nuclear reactor and plutonium extraction facilities in caves tunneled into a mountain at Naung Laing, a village in the Mandalay division. The information cited in the newspaper story reportedly originated from two high-ranking defectors who had settled in Australia.

On 3 June 2010, a five-year investigation by an anti-government Myanmar broadcaster, the Democratic Voice of Burma (DVB), found evidence that allegedly shows the country's military regime began a programme to develop nuclear weapons. The DVB said evidence of Myanmar's nuclear programme came from top-secret documents smuggled out of the country over several years, including hundreds of files and other evidence provided by Sai Thein Win, a former major in the military of Myanmar. A UN report said there was evidence that North Korea had been exporting nuclear technology to Myanmar, Iran and Syria.

Based on Win's evidence, Robert Kelley, a former weapons inspector, said he believed Myanmar "has the intent to go nuclear and it is... expending huge resources along the way." But as of 2010, experts said that Myanmar was a long way from succeeding, given the poor quality of their current materials. Despite Kelley's analysis, some experts are uncertain that a nuclear weapons programme exists; for example, the Institute for Science and International Security notes ambiguity as to whether certain equipment is used for uranium production, or for innocently producing "rare earth metals or metals such as titanium or vanadium". The U.S. expressed concern in 2011 about possible NPT violations, but by 2012 stated that its concerns had been "partially allayed".

Myanmar signed the Treaty on the Prohibition of Nuclear Weapons on 26 September 2018, but has not ratified it.

== Chemical weapons ==
The first public indications of Myanmar's possible possession of chemical weapons came in testimony delivered to the United States Congress in 1991 by Rear Admiral Thomas A. Brooks, Director of Naval Intelligence of the United States Navy, in which Myanmar was included on a list of nations that "probably possess" chemical weapons. However, the United States then took Myanmar off the list of nations with chemical weapons programmes in 1993.

In 2005 Belgian photojournalist Thierry Falise reported speaking to two deserters from the Burmese Army who, during their time in service, were "reportedly told to take special precautions because they were handling chemical shells". The deserters described seeing artillerymen wearing masks and gloves to fire the munitions. In a separate report from the same year, Martin Panter, a physician and the president of Christian Solidarity Worldwide, reported treating injuries of anti-government Karenni rebels that were "consistent with a chemical attack", and claimed that "strong circumstantial evidence exists for the use of chemicals, particularly nerve agents, pulmonary agents and possibly blister agents". In response to the Christian Solidarity Worldwide report, the Burmese government denied the use of chemical weapons. The NTI has stated that "without further investigation it is not clear if the reports refer to agents recognized under international law as chemical weapons or to riot control agents - the latter is most likely".

In January 2014 Unity Weekly, a Burmese magazine, reported that Myanmar was making chemical weapons. The magazine claimed that the military had seized hundreds of hectares of land to build a chemical weapons factory in Myanmar's Magway Region and quoted workers at the factory who said it produced chemical weapons. The magazine also claimed Chinese technicians were often seen around the factory. In response, the Burmese government sentenced the head of Unity Weekly, along with four Unity Weekly journalists, to ten years in prison and hard labor under colonial-era espionage laws. The Burmese government claims the factory produces "military equipment" but does not produce chemical weapons. Security experts remain unconvinced that the facility in Magway is being used to produce chemical weapons, but some, including prominent journalist Bertil Lintner, suggest that the site is tied to a secretive North Korean program to develop missile parts.

Myanmar signed the Chemical Weapons Convention in 1993 and ratified it in 2015.
