= ETRR-2 =

Nuclear research reactor in Egypt

(Multi-Purpose) Experimental Training Research Reactor No. 2
- Location within Egypt
- Operating institution: Nuclear Research Center
- Location: Inshas, Egypt
- Coordinates: 30°17′35.0″N 31°24′32.5″E
- Type: Light Water open pool reactor
- Power: 22 MW (thermal)

Construction and upkeep
- Construction cost: US$75 million
- Construction began: December 1, 1992
- First criticality: November 27, 1997
- Annual upkeep cost: US$6 million
- Staff: 25
- Operators: 8

Technical specifications
- Max thermal flux: 2.8E14
- Max fast flux: 2.2E14
- Cooling: Light Water
- Neutron moderator: Light Water
- Neutron reflector: BE
- Control rods: AG, IN, CD
- Cladding material: Aluminum Alloy

ETRR-2 or ET-RR-2 (Experimental Training Research Reactor Number two), (Egypt Test and Research Reactor Number two) or (Multi-Purpose Reactor) is the second nuclear reactor in Egypt supplied by the Argentine company Investigacion Aplicada (INVAP) in 1992. The reactor is owned and operated by Egyptian Atomic Energy Authority (EAEA) at the Nuclear Research Center in Inshas, 60 kilometres (37 mi) northeast of Cairo.

== History ==
Since 1990, Egypt started to search for a new research reactor to replace the aging ETRR-1 and the Israeli press claimed that Egypt was cooperating with Pakistan, Iraq and Argentina to build a plutonium-producing reactor for nuclear weapons. Finally, Egypt announced international tender and among the bidders were the Canadian Atomic Energy of Canada Limited, the French Framatome and the Argentinian INVAP.

In September 1992, a contract was signed between INVAP and the Egyptian Atomic Energy Authority (EAEA) and a branch office of INVAP in Nasr City was established to oversee the project with the construction works began in 1993 jointly by Argentina and Egypt.

In November 1997, ETRR-2 achieved initial criticality, and was inaugurated by the former Egyptian president Hosni Mubarak and the Argentine president Carlos Menem in February 1998.

== Overview ==
The ETRR-2 reactor hall, showing the main and auxiliary pools.

ETRR-2 is a Material Testing Reactor (MTR), multi-purpose open pool type 22 MW reactor with an initial fuel load of 19.75% enriched uranium U235 imported from Russia and the last shipment was delivered by Argentina in 1997. Since that, Egypt has fabricated the fuel rods for the ETRR-2 from the Fuel Manufacturing Pilot Plant (FMPP), which is located at the Nuclear Research Center in Inshas. The reactor core is cooled and moderated by light water and beryllium reflector. The spent fuel from the ETRR-2 reactor stored in a water-filled spent fuel pool near the reactor waiting for final disposal in deep geological formations.

According to the Wisconsin Project on Nuclear Arms Control and the International Institute for Strategic Studies, ETRR-2 could produce over 6 kilograms (13 lb) of plutonium annually which is enough for one nuclear weapon per year.

== Unreported nuclear experiments ==
In 2004–2005, an investigation by International Atomic Energy Agency (IAEA) discovered that between 1999 and 2003, Egypt conducted about 4 unreported experiments using a total of 0.24 g of natural uranium compounds irradiated at the ETRR-2 to test the production of fission product isotopes for medical purposes. The irradiated compounds had been dissolved in three laboratories located in the Nuclear Chemistry Building, but no plutonium or U-233 was separated during these experiments. Also, during the investigation Egypt disclosed the Radioisotope Production Facility which was a new facility under construction at Inshas, designed for the separation of radioisotopes from enriched 19.7% U-235 irradiated at the ETRR-2 reactor. Egypt should have reported the decision to construct the new facility no later than 1997.

Egypt justified its reporting failures as the government and the IAEA had “differing interpretations” of Egypt's safeguards obligations, emphasizing that the country's “nuclear activities are strictly for peaceful purposes.” Accordingly, Egypt showed full cooperation during the 2004–2005 investigation and had taken corrective actions by submitting inventory change reports (ICRs) and providing a modified design information for the ETRR-2 reactor and the Radioisotope Production Facility.

In 2009, The IAEA's Safeguards Implementation Report (SIR) for 2008, concludes that earlier issues of undeclared nuclear activities and material reported to the Board of Governors in February 2005 are no longer outstanding as the IAEA found no discrepancies between what have been declared during the investigation and IAEA's findings, and no evidences of extraction of plutonium or enrichment of uranium.

== Reactor specifications ==
Data from

=== General data ===
- Safeguards: IAEA
- Initial Cost: 75 M US$
- Annual Cost: 6 M US$
- Total Staff: 25
- No of Operators: 8

=== Technical data ===
- Reactor Type: Open pool
- Thermal Power, Steady (kW): 22,000.00
- Max Flux SS, Thermal (n/cm2-s): 2.8E14
- Max Flux SS, Fast (n/cm2-s): 2.2E14
- Thermal Power, Pulsed (MW): 0.00
- Moderator: Light Water
- Coolant: Light Water
- Forced Cooling: 2000 M3/H, upward
- Coolant Velocity in Core: 4.7 M/S
- Reflector: BE
- Reflector Number of Sides: 4
- Control Rods Material: AG, IN, CD
- Control Rods number: 6

=== Experimental facilities ===
- Horizontal Channels: 5
- Horizontal Max Flux (n/cm2-s): 4.0E9
- Horizontal Use: Neutron research and radiography
- Vertical Channels: none
- Core Irradiation Facilities: 3
- Core Max Flux (n/cm2-s): 1.25E14, thermal
- Reflector Irradiation Facilities: 26
- Loops Number: 2
- Loops Max Flux: 8E13
- Loops use: research, instrumental neutron activation analysis

=== Fuel data ===
- Origin of Fissile Material: Russia
- Enrichment Supplier: INVAP, Argentina
- Equilibrium Core Size: 40 DIA. X 48 X 80
- Plates per Element: 19
- Dimensions of Plates: 64 X 800 X 1.5
- Cladding Material: Aluminum Alloy
- Cladding Thickness, mm: 0.4
- Fuel Thickness, mm: 0.7
- Uranium Density, g/cm3: 3.017
- Burnup on Discharge, max %: 63.7
- Burnup Average, %: 61.7
- Last Shipment Year: 1997
- Last Receipt Year: 1997
- Fuel Fabricator: Argentina

=== Utilization ===
- Hours per Day: 24
- Days per Week: 1
- Weeks per Year: 48
- MW Days per Year: 920
- Materials/fuel test experiments: Yes
- Isotope production: Yes
- Neutron Scattering: No
- Neutron radiography: Yes
- Neutron capture therapy: No
- Activation Analysis: Yes
- Transmutation: Yes
- Geochronology: No
- Teaching: Yes
- Training: Yes
- Other Uses: medical and nuclear solid state research, condensed matter research, nuclear engineering experiments

== See also ==
- ETRR-1
- Nuclear program of Egypt
- Egyptian Atomic Energy Authority
- List of nuclear reactors
- Fuel Manufacturing Pilot Plant
