= Philippines and weapons of mass destruction =

The Philippines is not known, or believed, to possess weapons of mass destruction. Article II Section 8 of the Philippine Constitution explicitly forbids the presence of nuclear weapons in the Philippines.

The Philippines, as a ratifier to the Biological Weapons Convention, bans all production and import of biological weapons in the country. It also signed the Southeast Asian Nuclear-Weapon-Free Zone Treaty, thus promoting a nuclear-weapons-free Southeast Asia.

== Nuclear energy and weapons ==
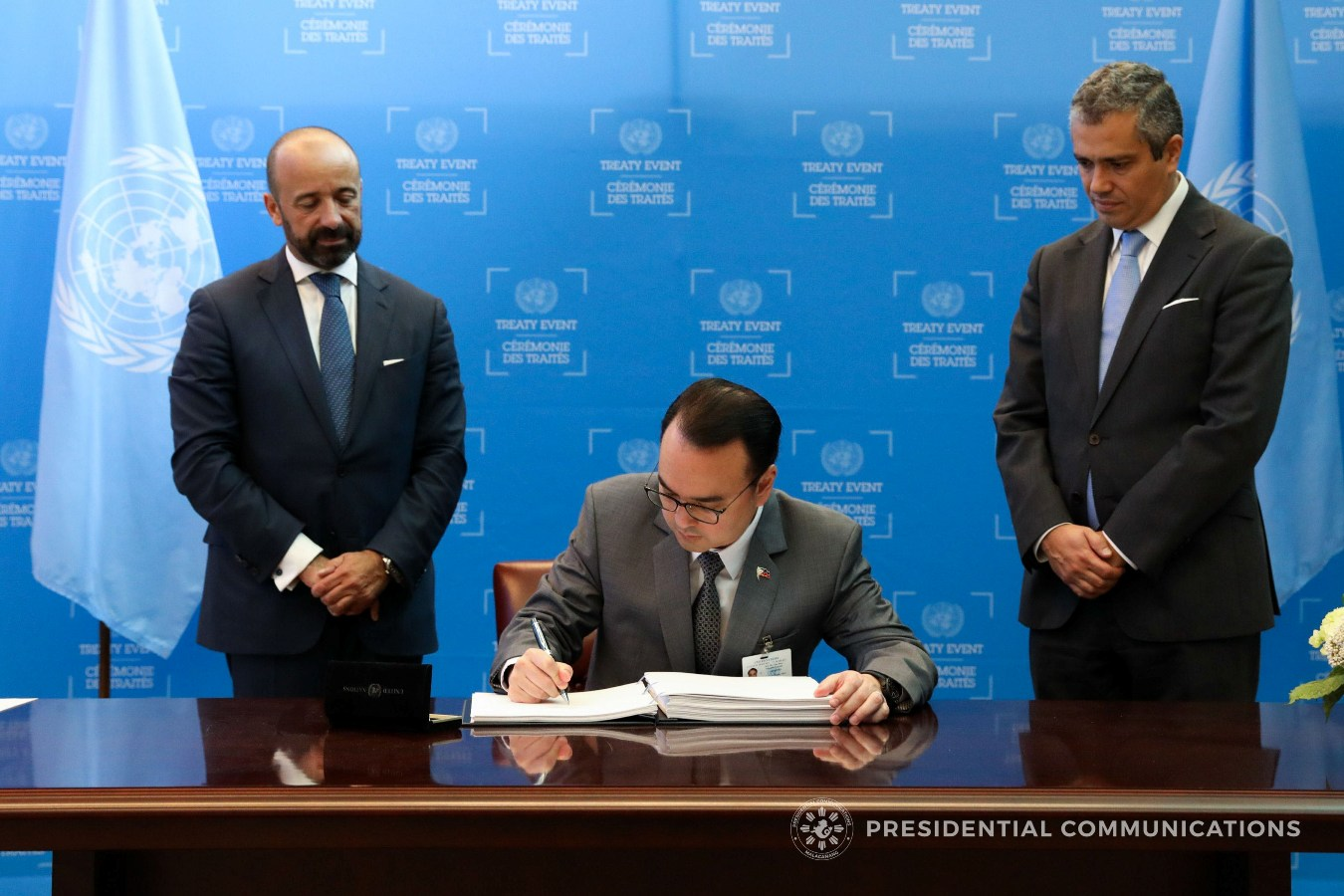
Philippine Foreign secretary Alan Peter Cayetano signing the Treaty on the Prohibition of Nuclear Weapons.

The Philippine nuclear program started in 1958 with the creation of the Philippine Atomic Energy Commission (PAEC) under Republic Act 2067. A year after Ferdinand Marcos declared martial law in 1972, he announced the decision to build a nuclear power plant at Bataan. Marcos reasoned that this was in response to the 1973 oil crisis, as the Middle East oil embargo had put a heavy strain on the Philippine economy. He temporarily suspended construction in 1979 citing health and safety concerns. The plant was completed in 1984. However, two years later in 1986, the year in which Marcos was ousted from power following the People Power Revolution, and the same year in which the reactor at Chernobyl, Soviet Union (now part of Ukraine) accidentally exploded, the new president Corazon Aquino decided not to operate the plant due to the proximity to a major geological fault and to then dormant stratovolcano Mt. Pinatubo which erupted in 1991.

In 2016, Senator Juan Ponce Enrile, a former defence secretary under the Marcos administration, claimed that the Bataan Nuclear Power Plant was intended to be used in a development of a nuclear weapons program. While he maintained that the facility's main purpose was for electricity generation he alleged that the nuclear power plant's second purpose is for nuclear weapons production. Enrile speculated that if the Philippines had successfully developed nuclear weapons, China would be deterred in pursuing aggressive claims in the South China Sea. Enrile later admitted that he was not an expert on the mechanics and technology of the production of nuclear weapons.

Beginning in December 1957, the United States of America used the Philippines as a storage base for hundreds of nuclear weapons. These included gravity bombs, depth bombs, and tactical nuclear weapons such as AIM-26 Falcon air-to-air missiles, RUR-5 ASROC anti-submarine missiles, and RIM-8 Talos surface-to-air missiles. An American document from December 1969 indicated that President Ferdinand Marcos had been informed of the weapons in 1966, but that it was believed that if it became publicly known it would "gravely jeopardize U.S.-Philippine relations," particularly on the eve of scheduled presidential elections. The presence of the weapons was not revealed publicly until much later. In 1974, after US nuclear weapons were removed from Taiwan, they were stationed at Clark Air Base, in Luzon. In 1976, 140 nuclear weapons were relocated back to the United States at Cubi Point, and by at least 1977, no nuclear weapons remained in the country.

Currently, however, there is a movement in the country that aims to stop construction of nuclear power plants in the country and terminate American military presence in the country, which were believed to house nuclear weapons on Philippine soil.

Despite provocations by China since 2010s amidst the South China Sea disputes, President Benigno Simeon Aquino III disagreed on letting the Philippines have nuclear weapons. He justified it from the lack of government funds to create such weapon, coupled with the fact that having such weapon would only escalate tensions between the two countries.

In 2019, Juan Ponce Enrile reiterates his earlier claims in 2016 that the Philippines should have developed nuclear weapons to assert its claims, particularly in reinforcing the Philippines v. China international arbitration ruling, regarding its territorial disputes with China. Defense secretary Delfin Lorenzana in response to Enrile's statement said that the Philippines is not planning to develop nuclear weapons due to the country's limited technological capabilities as well as legal obligations such as being party to the Non-Proliferation Treaty.

The Philippines signed the Treaty on the Prohibition of Nuclear Weapons on 20 September 2017, and ratified it on 18 February 2021.

In 2024, three people were arrested for illegally storing up to 85 kilograms of depleted Uranium-238 and Uranium-235 in separate locations in Pasay, Mandaue and Cagayan de Oro as part of a smuggling syndicate. Some of the uranium was discovered inside residential areas.

== Biological and chemical weapons ==
Rebels from the communist New People's Army were accused of using biological weapons against the Armed Forces of the Philippines in eastern Mindanao, but they refuted such a claim.

The Philippines signed the Chemical Weapons Convention in 1993.

In April 2025, President Bongbong Marcos signed into law Republic Act No. 12174, prohibiting the development, production, stockpiling, and use of chemical weapons in the Philippines.

== See also ==
- "WMD risk in southern Philippines worries US". ABS-CBN News. August 1, 2012.
