= Research Organization for Nuclear Energy =

Indonesian research organization

- Organisasi Riset Tenaga Nuklir (ORTN)

Agency overview
- Formed: 1 September 2021; 1 March 2022 (current form)
- Preceding agency: National Nuclear Energy Agency of Indonesia
- Jurisdiction: Indonesia
- Agency executive: Agus Sumaryanto, Acting Head of ORTN
- Parent agency: National Research and Innovation Agency

The Research Organization for Nuclear Energy (Indonesian: Organisasi Riset Tenaga Nuklir, ORTN) is one of Research Organizations under the umbrella of the National Research and Innovation Agency (Badan Riset dan Inovasi Nasional, BRIN). It was founded on 1 September 2021. The organization is the transformation of the National Nuclear Energy Agency of Indonesia (Badan Tenaga Nuklir Nasional, BATAN) after the liquidation of BATAN into BRIN.

== History ==
Founded on 1 September 2021 as ORTN (Organisasi Riset Tenaga Nuklir), ORTN was transformation of BATAN into BRIN. As research organization of BRIN, as outlined in Article 175 and Article 176 of Chief of BRIN Decree No. 1/2021, every Research Organizations under BRIN are responsible and answered to Chief of BRIN. It also prescribed that the Research Organizations consisted with Head of Research Organizations, Centers, and Laboratories/Study Groups. For the transitional period, as in Article 210 of Chairman of BRIN Decree No. 1/2021 mandated, the structure of ORTN follows the preceding structure that was already established during its time in BATAN. Due to this, the structure of ORTN largely follows the Chief of BATAN Decree No. 2/2021.

On 22 September 2021, ORTN constituting document, Chairman of BRIN Decree No. 6/2021, signed by Laksana Tri Handoko and fully published on 8 October 2021. In the constituting document, it is revealed ORTN retained BATAN old name. BATAN acronym however, no longer translated as "Badan Tenaga Nuklir Nasional", it just simply "BATAN", preserving historical BATAN name. Thus the name become ORTN-BATAN.

On 24 January 2022, ORTN-BATAN structure added with research centers formerly from Nuclear Energy Regulatory Agency and restructured. The change is effective from 1 February 2022. While ORTN-BATAN organization is finalized on 1 March 2022, the head position is yet to be finalized, resulting the organization head still an acting head. The organization name reverted again to ORTN and removing its "BATAN" name thru Chairman of BRIN Decree No. 6/2022, backdated from 25 February 2022.

== Structure ==
As the latest Chairman of BRIN Decree No. 15/2023, the current structure of ORTN is as follows:

1. Office of the Head of ORTN
2. Research Center for Radiation Process Technology
3. Research Center for Accelerator Technology
4. Research Center for Nuclear Materials and Radioactive Waste Technology
5. Research Center for Nuclear Beam Analysis Technology
6. Research Center for Nuclear Reactor Technology
7. Research Center for Radioisotopes, Radiopharmaceuticals, and Biodosimetry Technology
8. Research Center for Technologies of Nuclear Safety, Metrology, and Quality Control
9. Research Groups

== List of heads ==
No.	Head	Took office	Left office	Title
1	Agus Sumaryanto	1 September 2021	19 July 2022	Acting Head of ORTN
2	Rohadi Awaludin	19 July 2022	Incumbent	Head of ORTN
