= ETRR-1 =

Egyptian nuclear research reactor

Experimental Training Research Reactor No. 1
- Operating institution: Nuclear Research Center
- Location: Inshas, Egypt
- Type: Light water tank WWR
- Power: 2 MW (thermal)

Construction and upkeep
- Construction began: March 1, 1958
- First criticality: February 8, 1961
- Staff: 18
- Operators: 7
- Refuel frequency: Had never been refueled since the initial fuel load

Technical specifications
- Max thermal flux: 1.5E13
- Max fast flux: 3.6E13
- Fuel type: 10% enriched U235 EK-10
- Cooling: Light water
- Neutron moderator: Light water
- Neutron reflector: H_{2}O
- Control rods: BC, SS; 16 per element
- Cladding material: Aluminum alloy

ETRR-1 or ET-RR-1 (Experimental Training Research Reactor Number one, and sometimes called Egypt Test and Research Reactor Number one), is the first nuclear reactor in Egypt supplied by the USSR in 1958. The reactor is owned and operated by Egyptian Atomic Energy Authority (AEA) at the Nuclear Research Center in Inshas, 40–60 kilometres (25–37 mi) northeast of Cairo.

ETRR-1 is the second oldest research reactor in the Middle East, after the Israeli IRR-1 reactor.

== Overview ==
The reactor is a Light Water tank type WWR 2 MW research reactor with an initial fuel load of 3.2 kilograms (7.1 lb) 10% enriched uranium U235 (EK-10) imported from Russia, since then the reactor had never been refueled.

In the 1980s, ETRR-1 reactor was shut down to modernize and extend the reactor's operability by the International Atomic Energy Agency (IAEA).

== Unreported nuclear experiments ==
In March 2001 and July 2002, the IAEA was investigating on the environmental samples which was taken from the ETRR-1's hot cells that revealed traces of actinides and fission products, which was explained by Egypt in July 2003, that the presence of the particles was attributed by a damaged nuclear fuel cladding resulted in contamination of the reactor water that penetrated the hot cells from irradiated sample cans.

In 2004–2005, an investigation by IAEA discovered that between 1999 and 2003, Egypt conducted about 12 unreported experiments, performed using a total of 1.15g of natural uranium compounds and 9 thorium samples had been irradiated and conducted at the ETRR-1 to test the production of fission product isotopes for medical purposes. The irradiated compounds had been dissolved in three laboratories, located in the Nuclear Chemistry Building with no plutonium or U-233 being separated during these experiments.

Egypt justified its reporting failures, as the government and the IAEA had “differing interpretations” of Egypt's safeguards obligations and emphasizing that the country's “nuclear activities are strictly for peaceful purposes” Accordingly, Egypt maintained full cooperation during the 2004–2005 investigation, and had taken corrective actions by submitting inventory change reports (ICRs) and providing a modified design information for the ETRR-1 reactor.

In 2009, The IAEA's Safeguards Implementation Report (SIR) for 2008, concludes that earlier issues of undeclared nuclear activities and material reported to the Board of Governors in February 2005, are no longer outstanding, as the IAEA found no discrepancies between what have been declared during the investigation, and IAEA's findings and no evidences of extraction of plutonium or enrichment of uranium.

== Accidents ==
- In April 2010, one of the cooling pumps of the ETRR-1's reactor broke, according to Mohamed Al-Qolali, the Director of the Egyptian Atomic Energy Authority, the accident was immediately fixed without any radioactive water leakage, as this incident happened due to operating the reactor without receiving safe operation permission from the Nuclear Safety Authority. According to Al-Qolali, the reactor director and the operating manager were responsible for the accident and there were two visits by IAEA, one on July and another one on August, to ensure that the security measures had been taken, and they recommend for urgent renovation of the aging reactor, in order to restoring operations.
- On 25 May 2011, another incident of water leakage happened again for the second time, due to explosion in the reactor's pump, which released 10 cubic metres (350 cu ft) of radioactive water, according to a source at the Atomic Energy Authority said to a Rose El Youssef newspaper, that the disaster is considered to be a third degree, according to the IAEA's International Nuclear Event Scale. The government and officials denied any radiation leaks, and attributed the accident to a leakage of water from a pump that has nothing to do with the normal fuel cycle. Finally, The Atomic Energy Authority admitted of a leak of radioactive water from ETRR-1, with a zero risk to the reactor and the neighboring area, as the leaking fluid was immediately contained, according to Naguib Ashoub, Director of the Department of Reactors "the first reactor is 50 years old and hasn't been operated for a year and a half," and he explained that, "the leak took place during the maintenance of the pump," confirming that the safety measures had been taken without any leaks outside the chamber and that IAEA's inspectors visited the reactor, the day after the leak, without detecting any radiation. A contradicting statement by Samir Mekheimar, a former Director at the Nuclear Research Center said, "the fact that the reactor was by mere chance not operated the next day saved the area from environmental disaster." Also, he added, that the leak was due to an operator error and the AEA ordered its staff not to publicize the leak or face dismissal. In addition, according to Hani Amer, which was an Egyptian Nuclear Safety Agency's inspector who visited the site, attributed the accident due to a valve failure coolant from the primary reactor was not able to flow through the correct channels to the waste tanks, and no workers had been exposed to radioactivity and that,"the radiation level was in the range of 1 microsievert per hour, which is four times the normal background level of 0.25 microsievert per hour."

== Reactor specifications ==
Data from

=== General data ===
- Safeguards: IAEA
- Total Staff: 18
- No of Operators: 7

=== Technical data ===
- Reactor Type: Tank WWR
- Thermal Power, Steady (kW): 2,000.00
- Max Flux SS, Thermal (n/cm2-s): 1.5E13
- Max Flux SS, Fast (n/cm2-s): 3.6E13
- Thermal Power, Pulsed (MW): 0.00
- Moderator: Light water
- Coolant: Light water
- Forced Cooling: 960 cubic metres per hour (34,000 cu ft/h)
- Coolant Velocity in Core: 1.8 metres per second (5.9 ft/s)
- Reflector: H_{2}O
- Control Rods Material: BC, SS
- Control Rods number: 9

=== Experimental facilities ===
- Horizontal Channels: 9
- Horizontal Max Flux (n/cm2-s): 5.0E8
- Horizontal Use: Neutron physics, solid state, and shielding
- Vertical Channels: 8
- Vertical Max Flux (n/cm2-s): 0.8E13
- Vertical Use: Production of radioisotopes
- Core Irradiation Facilities: 1
- Core Max Flux (n/cm2-s): 0.8E13
- Loops Max Flux: 1.0E13

=== Fuel data ===
- Origin of Fissile Material: Russia
- Enrichment Supplier: Russia
- Equilibrium Core Size: 44
- Rods per Element: 16
- Dimensions of Rods: 10 millimetres (0.39 in) diameter, 500 litres (110 imp gal; 130 US gal)
- Cladding Material: Aluminum alloy
- Cladding Thickness: 1.5 millimetres (0.059 in)
- Fuel Thickness: 7 millimetres (0.28 in)
- Burnup on Discharge, max %: 25
- Burnup Average, %: 20
- Fuel Fabricator: Russia

=== Utilization ===
- Hours per Day: 3
- Days per Week: 3
- Weeks per Year: 20
- MW Days per Year: 96
- Materials/fuel test experiments: No
- Neutron Scattering: No
- Neutron Radiography: No
- Neutron capture therapy: No
- Activation Analysis: No
- Transmutation: No
- Geochronology: No
- Other Uses: Solid state, nuclear, and reactor physics, chemical research, isotope production, and biological irradiation

== See also ==
- ETRR-2
- Nuclear program of Egypt
- Egyptian Atomic Energy Authority
- List of nuclear reactors
- Fuel Manufacturing Pilot Plant
