= Nuclear Power Plants Authority (Egypt) =

Egyptian agency

NPPA: is an Egyptian public economic authority of a special nature, affiliated to the Ministry of Electricity and Renewable Energy

== Establishment ==
NPPA was established pursuant to Law No. (13) of 1976, as amended by Law No. (210) of 2017, as a public economic authority of a special nature, affiliated to the Ministry of Electricity and Renewable Energy, and is the only authority competent to establish, operate and manage nuclear power plants in the Arab Republic of Egypt. The main headquarters of NPPA is located in Cairo. NPPA possesses national capabilities, including with respect to the scientific qualifications and accumulated expertise necessary for achieving the duties assigned to it in relation to the management, operation and maintenance of nuclear power plants in the Arab Republic of Egypt (ARE).

== Mission ==
NPPA is competent to carry out the following duties:

- Implementing and managing nuclear power plant projects.
- Concluding agreements with similar local and international entities.
- Preparing and qualifying human resources locally and internationally.
- Establishing nuclear power plants to generate electricity and desalinate water.
- Conducting the necessary researches and studies, which are necessary for the construction of nuclear power projects.
- Establishing the basis for the specifications related to the construction of nuclear power plant projects.

== Organizational structure ==
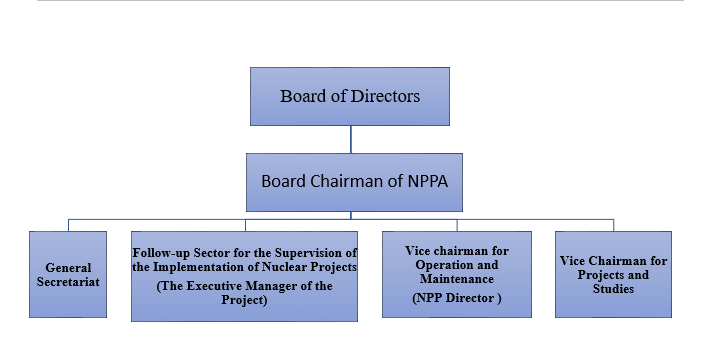
NPPA Organizational Structure

== The Importance of The Egyptian Nuclear Program ==
Egypt was one of the first countries that became cognizant of the importance of using nuclear energy in electricity generation and sea water desalination in the early 1950s, so as to contribute to optimising the benefits of Egypt's primary energy and fresh water resources as follows:

- Diversifying sources of electricity generation.
- Developing and upgrading local industry to meet international standards along with the transfer and localisation of technology.
- Placing Egypt as a leading country in the Middle East and Africa among developed countries, especially in areas related to the peaceful uses of nuclear energy.
- Preserving energy resources, such as petroleum and natural gas, which are depleted and non-renewable resources. Therefore, they must be consumed diligently so as to not deprive future generations of important resources for sustainable and independent development.
- Optimising the added value of petroleum and natural gas use as an indispensable raw material in petrochemical industries, as well as their use in fertilizers and transportation instead of consuming them to generate electricity.
- Reducing the rates of petroleum products importation for all uses, which are increasing on a yearly basis despite the extended use of natural gas, in respect of which Egypt has become a net importer in recent years.

== El-Dabaa Nuclear Power Plant Project ==
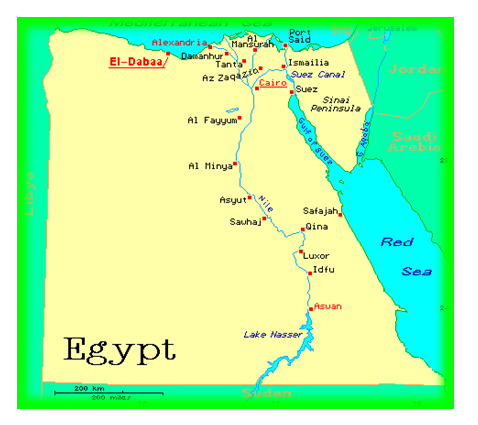
El-Dabaa nuclear power plant project

The substantial efforts made by Egypt and its governments throughout many years in seeking to enter the nuclear field resulted in signaling the commencement of the construction of the El-Dabaa NPP. It is planned to build four Russian VVER reactors with a capacity of 1200 MW each (AES-2006). It is worth mentioning that this reactor belongs to the category of pressurized water reactors (advanced third generation reactors GEN 3+), which are currently among the most advanced reactors in the world.

The project is currently being implemented at the El-Dabaa site which is located 150 km west of Alexandria on the Mediterranean coast, in the north of the Arab Republic of Egypt (ARE). Multiple contracts have been concluded between the NPPA and Rosatom as the main contractor for the project, including the Engineering, Procurement and Construction contract, Nuclear Fuel Supply contract, Operation Support and Maintenance contract, as well as the Spent Nuclear Fuel contract.

== Stages of Implementation of the El-Dabaa NPP ==
=== First Stage ===
The preparatory stage began in December 2017 and lasted about two and a half years, aimed at preparing the site for the construction works.

It is worth noting that the El-Dabaa NPP project was chosen as one of the best 3 nuclear projects in terms of launching, on the sidelines of the eleventh edition of “Rosatom Expo 2019”, the largest nuclear conference and exhibition in the world which was held in Sochi. and marked the first time that a nuclear project in the Middle East was granted this award.

=== Second Stage ===
The construction stage, which is the current project stage and which commenced following the obtainment of the construction permit for unit 1 from the Egyptian Nuclear and Radiological Regulatory Authority (ENRRA).on 29 June 2022, and includes all works related to building, constructing, training NPPA personnel, and preparing to carry out operational tests.

=== Third Stage ===
This is the final stage after obtaining the pre-commissioning testing permit, and includes commissioning works and the commencement of actual operation until the provisional take-over of the first unit and the issuance of the operating license.

The progress of the project implementation is contingent upon the issuance of licenses, as their issuance confirms the compliance with all requirements related to the safety and security of the nuclear power plant.

Accordingly, NPPA is keen to obtain all required licenses and permits related to the site, the reactor design, the construction, commissioning testing and commercial operation.

== Milestones ==
The Arab Republic of Egypt has undertaken many actions, procedures and activities to enhance and prepare its nuclear infrastructure to be able implement and operat NPP projects efficiently, safely and reliably. The following table shows the milestones achieved with respect the Egyptian nuclear program in order to establish a NPP

1955	Establishment of the Atomic Energy committee
1957	Establishment of the Atomic Energy Authority
1957	Egypt is a founding of the International Atomic Energy Agency (IAEA), and in laying the foundation upon which the IAEA mandate is established as well as supporting the peaceful uses of nuclear energy.
1958	Establishment of the first research nuclear reactor, under the name of Experimental Research and Training Reactor (ETRR-1), which was supplied by the Soviet Union; and inaugurated in Anshas in 1958.
1963	Establishment of the Nuclear Engineering Department at Alexandria University
1964	Launching an international tender for the construction of a nuclear power plant with a capacity of 15 MW for electricity generation and seawater desalination in Sidi Kerir.
1966	Issuance of a letter of intent to the first bidder.
1967	The war of June 1967 and suspension of the project.
1974	Launching a restricted tender among American companies to construct a nuclear power plant with a capacity of 600 MW in Sidi Kerir.
1976	Establishment of the NPPA.
1976	Establishment of the Supreme Council of Energy.
1977	Establishment of the Nuclear Materials Authority.
1978	Suspension of the project due to the accident of the Three Mile Island reactor in the USA.
1980	Selection of the El-Dabaa site for the construction of the Egyptian NPP.
1981	Ratification of the Nuclear Non-Proliferation Treaty by the Arab Republic of Egypt.
1981	Issuance of the presidential decree allocating the El-Dabaa site for the establishment of the NPP project.
1981	The Supreme Council of Energy approves the Egyptian nuclear program.
1981	Establishing a fund to support alternative energy projects.
1983	Invitation to an international tender for the construction of a NPP with a capacity of 1000 MW.
1986	Suspension of the project following the Chernobyl accident in Ukraine.
1998	Operation of the second Egyptian experimental reactor with a capacity of 22 MW at Anshas.
2006	Initiating a national dialogue to study the use of nuclear power in electricity generation.
2006	Restructuring the Supreme Council of Energy chaired by the Prime Minister.
2007	Announcing Egypt's strategic decision to build a number of reactors for electricity generation.
2007	Establishment of the Supreme Council for the Peaceful Use of Nuclear Energy headed by the President of the Republic.
2009	"Worley Parsons" chosen as a consultant for the project.
2010	Preparing and submitting the documents related to licensing the El-Dabaa site for the construction of the first NPP to ENRRA.
2010	Promulgation of Law No. 7 of 2010 Regulating Nuclear and Radiological Activities.
2011	Completion of the technical specifications and tender documents preparation.
2012	Establishment of the ENRRA, which is affiliated to the Prime Minister and undertakes regulatory and supervisory works for all activities related to the peaceful use of nuclear energy.
2015	The Arab Republic of Egypt received three technical and financing offers from Russia, China and South Korea. The Russian offer was deemed to be the most suitable offer. On November 19, 2015, an inter-governmental agreement was signed between the Government of the Arab Republic of Egypt, and the Government of the Russian Federation, .
2016/2017	Negotiations with the Russian party for the construction and operation of a nuclear plant, the supply of fuel and the storage of spent fuel. The NPP consists of four VVER reactor units with a capacity of 1200 MW per unit.
December 2016	The engineering, procurement and construction contract was signed (EPC Contract).
25 February 2017	On February 25, 2017, as part of the efforts to promote public awareness and acceptance of the El-Dabaa Nuclear Power Plant project, a public ceremony was held as part of the project community dialogue in the presence of. Mohamed Shaker, Minister of Electricity and Renewable Energy and the Governor of Matrouh, with the participation of El-Dabaa residents and all local stakeholders.
December 2017	The project contracts entered into force and the preparatory stage of the project commenced.
March 2019	Issuance of the El-Dabaa Site Approval Permit (SAP) by ENRRA.
November 2019	The IAEA team of experts completed the Integrated Nuclear Infrastructure Review mission to assist the Arab Republic of Egypt in assessing the status of nuclear infrastructure.
2019	The Egyptian nuclear project was granted an award upon its recognition as one of the top 3 project launches.
2020	Commencement of the docking facility for the purpose of delivering the equipment of the El-Dabaa NPP.
August 2021	Commencement of manufacturing of long lead equipment, including the core catcher.
September 2021	Commencement of the training of the Egyptian personnel with respect to the operation and maintenance works.
October 2021	NPPA's Project Team responsible for oversseing the implementation of the El-Dabaa NPP Project, was granted the Best Team Award and the project was awarded the first place in the Egypt Governmental Excellence Award in its second edition.
June 2021	Obtainment of the construction permit for the first unit of the El-Dabaa NPP.
July 2021	Pouring of the first concrete for the first unit of the El-Dabaa NPP.
October 2021	Obtainment of the construction permit for the second unit of the El-Dabaa NPP.
November 2022	Pouring of the first concrete for the second unit at the El-Dabaa NPP
March 2023	The website of the Nuclear Power Plants Authority is among the best distinguished government websites in the Egypt Government Excellence Competition for the year 2023
May 2023	Pouring of the first concrete for the third unit at the El-Dabaa NPP

== Choosing Rosatom ==
The Russian Federation is currently one of the largest exporters of nuclear reactors and currently has nuclear power plant projects under construction in Bangladesh, Belarus, Hungary, China, India and Turkey. Rosatom has also accumulated experience in the field of nuclear power plant construction and operation, as it has supplied many nuclear power plants currently in operation, totaling to (96) reactors of various Russian models which operate efficiently in (14) countries.

== Impact of the El-Dabaa Nuclear Power Plant Project ==
The implementation of the nuclear power project has many positive effects on the following:

The i construction, operation and maintenance of nuclear power plants will require thousands of highly skilled personnel at different professional levels, which will contribute to reducing the unemployment rate, in addition to the following key advantages

- Around 5000-6000 people participate in the construction works of the nuclear power plant over a period of 6 consecutive years per unit. The construction works of all 4 units would last for about 10 years.
- About 1,000 people participate in the operation and maintenance of one unit. The aggregate number of persons involved in the operation of all 4 units would reach 4,000 people over the operational life of the nuclear plant which is 60 years.
- Providing job opportunities in complementary and auxiliary industries and workshops.
- The nuclear power plant project will contribute to elevating the quality standards of local industry in line with the required standards specific to nuclear industries. This will necessarily lead to a significant boom in the capabilities of the local industry and its competitiveness in the local and global market.
- The use of nuclear energy power plants for electricity generation will reduce the consumption rates of natural gas and oil, and allow for their usage in petrochemical industries raising their added value.
- The electricity produced from nuclear power plants will reduce the number of subsidies provided by the government for the supply of electricity to consumers.
- Achieving the local participation rate of at least 20% for the first unit, which gradually increases with the number of units so as to reach 35% for the fourth unit.

== Achievements ==
The El-Dabaa NPP project was chosen as one of the 3 best nuclear projects in terms of launch in the eleventh edition of the largest nuclear conference and exhibition in the world «Rosatom Expo», which was held in Sochi, Russia. This award is the first of its kind to be awarded to a nuclear project located in the Middle East.

The award commemorates Egypt's efforts to agree the best technical specifications and conditions upon which the contracts were concluded with the Russian partner implementing the nuclear power plant project in El-Dabaa.

As part of the continuous outstanding achievements of the NPPA under the leadership of its board chairman, Amgad El-Wakeel, the El-Dabaa Nuclear Power Plant project team won the Government Excellence Award for the best national team. The award was received by Eng. Mohamed Ramadan, Vice Board Chairman for Operation and Maintenance.

== See also ==
- Boiling water reactor
- Energy law
- Nuclear Energy Agency
- Nuclear reactor safety system
- Nuclear technology
- Pressurized water reactor
