= Reaktor Serba Guna G.A. Siwabessy =

Research reactor located in South Tangerang, Banten, Indonesia

Coordinates: 6°21′08.8″S 106°39′47.0″E

Reaktor Serba Guna–Gerrit Augustinus Siwabessy (RSG-GAS) (Multipurpose Reactor–Gerrit Augustinus Siwabessy) is a research reactor located in the Serpong neighborhood of South Tangerang, Banten, Indonesia. The reactor plays an important role in the Centre for Nuclear Industry Development, at Puspiptek, Serpong to serve other supporting laboratories, namely, radioisotope production, nuclear material science, reactor fuel element development, reactor safety, waste treatment, radio-metallurgy and nuclear-mechano laboratories.

The reactor was constructed through a $50 million contract with Interatom Internationale Atomreaktorbau GmbH, a unit of the West German steelmaker Kraftwerke Union, which was awarded in 1981. The reactor's fuel rods have originated in the United States, France and the United Kingdom; the fuel was enriched in the United States and Russia. The International Atomic Energy Agency safeguards the reactor. It was inaugurated by the second President of Indonesia, Suharto on August 20, 1987. The reactor was named after G.A. Siwabessy, Minister of Health and Minister of Atomic Energy under both president Sukarno and Suharto.

RSG-GAS went to its first criticality on July 29, 1987. The nominal power of 30 MW thermal was achieved on March 23, 1992, at the sixth core containing 40 standard fuel elements and 8 control fuel elements.
