= Hot cell =

Shielded nuclear radiation containment chamber

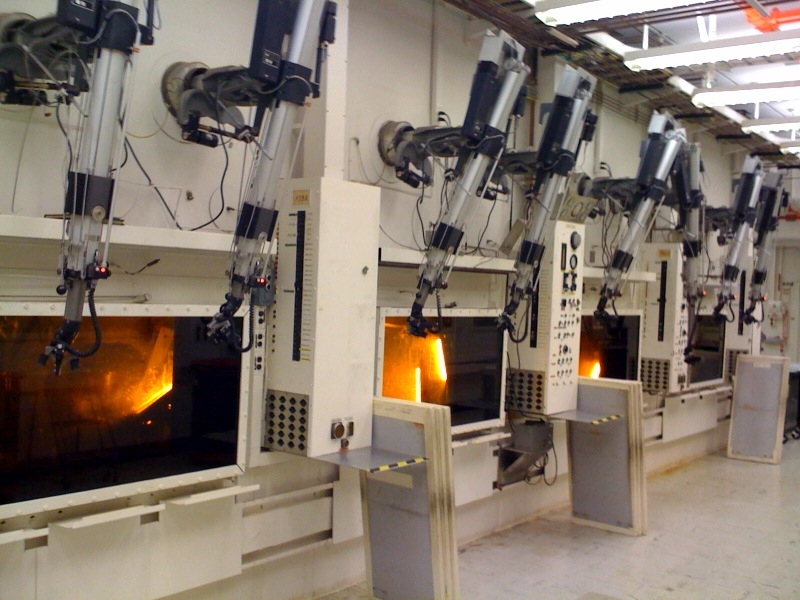
Hot cells at the Argonne National Laboratory. Each cell is equipped with a viewing window and two remote manipulators.

A hot cell is a name given to a containment chamber that is shielded against nuclear radiation. The word hot refers to radioactivity.

Hot cells are used in both the nuclear energy and the nuclear medicines industries. They are required to protect individuals from radioactive isotopes by providing a safe containment box in which they can control and manipulate the equipment required.

== Nuclear industry ==
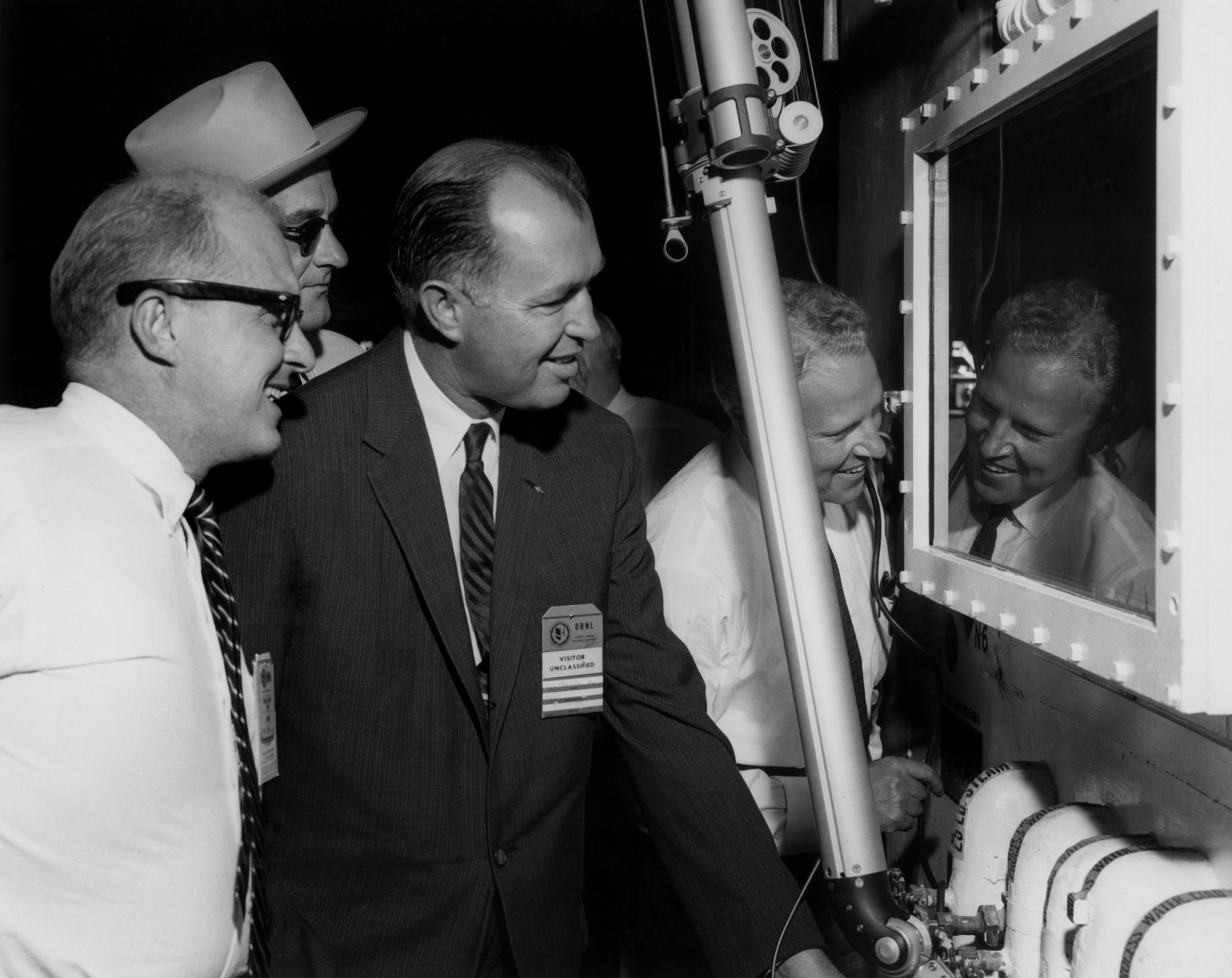
Cayce Pentecost, Lyndon B. Johnson, Buford Ellington and Albert Gore Sr operating mechanical hands at a hot cell at Oak Ridge National Laboratory, on October 19, 1958.

Hot cells are used to inspect spent nuclear fuel rods and to work with other items which are high-energy gamma ray emitters. For instance, the processing of medical isotopes, having been irradiated in a nuclear reactor or particle accelerator, would be carried out in a hot cell. Hot cells are of nuclear proliferation concern, as they can be used to carry out the chemical steps used to extract plutonium (whether weapons grade or not) from reactor fuel. The cutting of the used fuel, the dissolving of the fuel in hot nitric acid and the first extraction cycle of a nuclear reprocessing PUREX process (highly active cycle) would need to be done in a hot cell. The second cycle of the PUREX process (medium active cycle) can be done in gloveboxes.

== Nuclear medicine industry ==
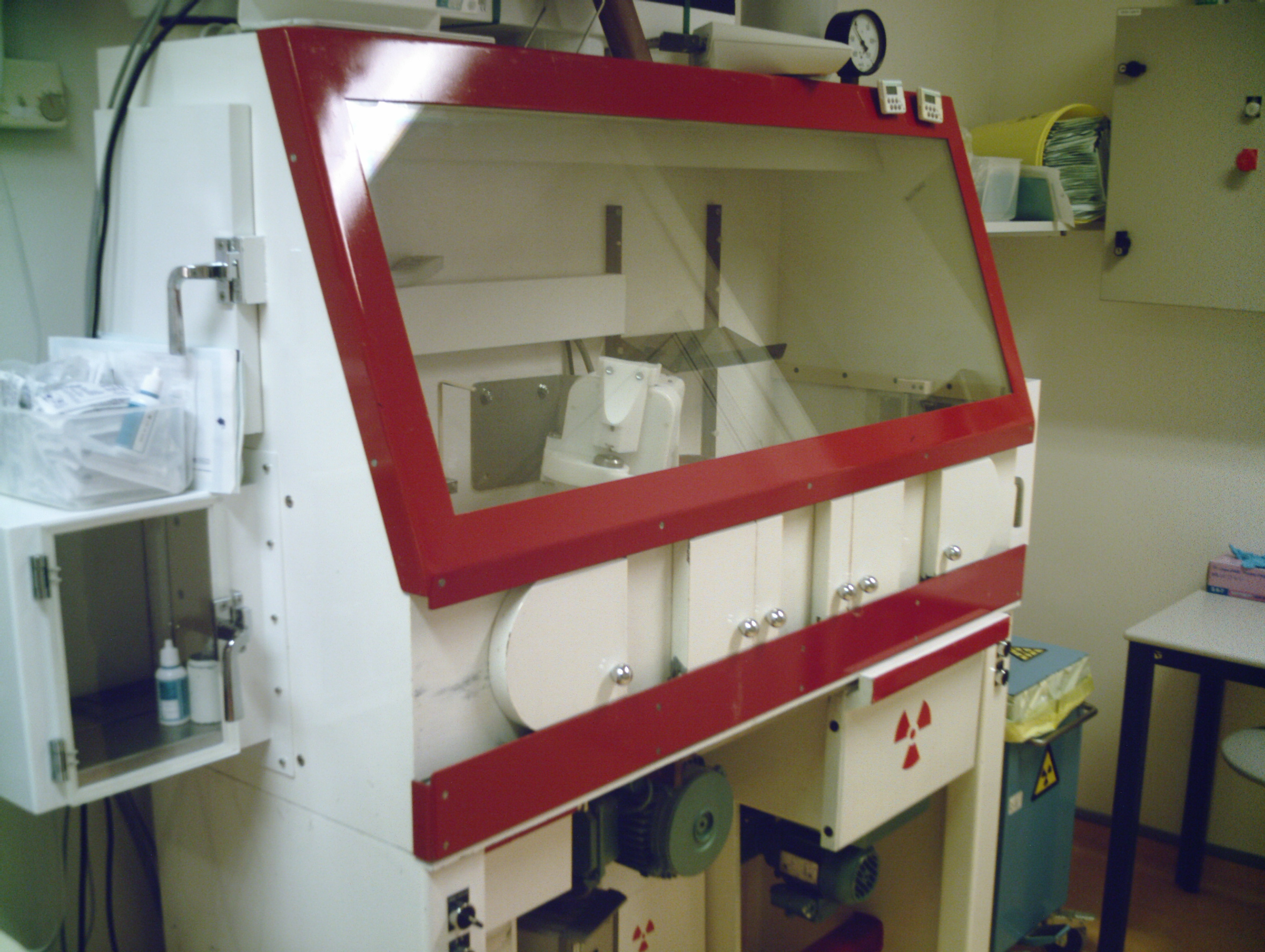
Hot cell in a hospital used for the preparation of Technetium-99m for use in single-photon emission computed tomography.

Hot cells are commonly used in the nuclear medicines industry:

- for the production of radiopharmaceuticals, according to GMP guidelines (industry)
- for the manipulation and dispense of radiopharmaceuticals (hospitals).

The user must never be subject to shine paths that are emitted from the radioactive isotopes and therefore there generally is heavy shielding around the containment boxes, which can be made out of 316 stainless steel or other materials such as PVC or Corian. This shielding can be ensured by the use of lead (common) or materials such as concrete (very large walls are therefore required) or even tungsten. The amount of radioactivity present in the hot cell, the energy of the gamma photons emitted by the radioisotopes, and the number of neutrons that are formed by the material will prescribe how thick the shielding must be. For instance a 1 kilocurie (37 TBq) source of cobalt-60 will require thicker shielding than a 1 kilocurie (37 TBq) source of iridium-192 to give the same dose rate at the outer surface of the hot cell. Also if some actinide materials such as californium or spent nuclear fuel are used within the hot cell then a layer of water or polyethylene may be needed to lower the neutron dose rate.

== Viewing windows ==
A video look inside the Idaho National Laboratory hot cell.

In order to view what is in the hot cell, cameras can be used (but these require replacing on a regular basis) or most commonly, lead glass is used. There are several densities for lead glass, but the most common is 5.2 g/cm^{3}. A rough calculation for lead equivalence would be to multiply the required Pb thickness by 2.5 (e.g. 10 mm Pb would require a 25 mm thick lead glass window). Older hot cells used a ZnBr_{2} solution in a glass tank to shield against high-energy gamma rays. This shielded the radiation without darkening the glass (as happens to leaded glass with exposure). This solution also "self-repairs" any damage caused by radiation interaction, but leads to optical distortion due to the difference in optical indices of the solution and glass.

== Manipulators ==
Telemanipulators or tongs are used for the remote handling of equipment inside hot cells, thereby avoiding heavy finger/hand doses.

== Gloves ==
Lead loaded gloves are often used in conjunction with tongs as they offer better dexterity and can be used in low radiation environments (such as hot cells used in hospital nuclear medicine labs). Some companies have developed tungsten loaded gloves which offer greater dexterity than lead loaded gloves, with better shielding than their counterparts. Gloves must be regularly replaced as the chemicals used for the cleaning/sterilisation process of the containments cause considerable wear and tear.

== Clean rooms ==
Hot cells can be placed in clean rooms with an air classification ranging from D to B (C is the most common).

== Types ==
=== Research and development cells ===
These cells are often used to test new chemistry units or processes. They are generally fairly large as they require flexibility for the use of varying chemistry units which can greatly vary in size (e.g. synthera and tracerlab). Some cells require remote manipulation.

=== Stack mini-cells ===
This type of hot cell is used purely for production of radiopharmaceuticals. A chemistry unit is placed in each cell, the production process is initiated (receiving the radioactive ^{18}F from the cyclotron) and once finished, the cells are left closed for a minimum of 6 hours allowing the radiation to decrease to a safe level. No manipulation is necessary here.

=== Production and dispense cells ===
Cells used to dispense products. For example, once Fludeoxyglucose (18F) (FDG) has been produced from ^{18}F mixing with glucose, a bulk vial is put into in a dispense cell and its contents carefully dispensed into a number of syringes or vials. Remote manipulation is crucial at this stage.
