= Egyptian Atomic Energy Authority =

The Egyptian Atomic Energy Authority (EAEA) has been established in 1955. It leads the national research and development in the basic and applied peaceful nuclear research.

Egypt was the second in the African Continent, after South Africa, to build a nuclear reactor. The first research reactor (ET-RR-1), commissioned in 1961, is a Van de Graf type 4 MW reactor engineered and built by Russia. Another research reactor (ET-RR-2) is 22 MW open pool MultiPurpose Reactor (MPR) located at Inshas, 60 km from Cairo, engineered and built by INVAP from Argentina.

The EAEA has scientists educated in the topmost universities and research institutes. It is organized into four research centers:

- Nuclear Research Center (NRC)
- Hot Laboratory and Waste Management Center (HLWMC)
- National Centre for Radiation Research and Technology (NCRRT)
- National Centre for Nuclear Safety and Radiation Control (NCNSRC)

These centres are further subdivided into major research divisions.

The EAEA is a member of the International Atomic Energy Agency and other regional and international organizations.

== See also ==
- Energy in Egypt
