= Inshas =

Village in Sharqia Governorate, Egypt

Inshas أنشاص الرمل
- Village
- Location within Egypt
- Coordinates: 30°22′52″N 31°27′30″E
- Country: Egypt
- Governorate: Sharqia Governorate
- Markaz: Bilbeis
- Time zone: UTC+2 (EET)
  - Summer (DST): UTC+3 (EEST)

Inshas (Arabic: أنشاص الرمل) is a village located in Bilbeis, Sharqia Governorate, 60 kilometers east of Cairo, Egypt.

It holds the first experimental nuclear reactor to be operated in Egypt ETRR-1 as well as the second experimental reactor ETRR-2, the Egyptian Atomic Energy Authority Experimental Farm, unauthorized IAEA.

Following the creation of the Arab League in March 1945, Inshas held the first Arab League Summit in May 1946.

Inshas hosts the Thunderbolt School, a training facility for the Egyptian army's El-Sa'ka Forces. The facility was used to train Palestinian commandos (fedayeen), including members of the Arab Nationalist Movement between 1962 and 1965.

The village has a mosque, named for King Farouk I and managed by the Egyptian Ministry of Religious Endowments. Construction of the mosque begun in 1923, during the reign of Farouk's predecessor, King Fuad I, and was completed in preparation for the 1946 Arab Summit.
