= List of nuclear research reactors =

This is an annotated list of all the nuclear fission-based nuclear research reactors in the world, sorted by country, with operational status. Some "research" reactors were built for the purpose of producing material for nuclear weapons.

== Algeria ==
Nuclear research reactors in Algeria
Name	Location	Type	Purpose	Status	Thermal power [kW]	Operation date	Closure date	Owner and operator	Notes
Nur	Algiers	Pool		Temporary shutdown	1,000	1989-03-24		Centre de Dévéloppement des Techniques Nucléaires	
Es Salam	Aïn Oussera, Djelfa	Heavy water		Operational	15,000	1992-02-17		Centre de Recherche Nucléaire de Birine (CRNB)	

== Antarctica ==
Nuclear research reactors in Antarctica
Name	Location	Reactor type	Purpose	Status	Capacity (kW)	Construction start date	Operation date	Closure	Operator and owner
PM-3A NNPU "Nukey Poo"	McMurdo Station		Power reactor	Shut down	1,800		1962	1972-09, fully dismantled 1979	US Navy

== Argentina ==
Nuclear research reactors in Argentina
Name	Location	Type	Purpose	Status	Thermal power [kW]	Operation date	Closure date	Owner and operator	Notes
RA-10	Buenos Aires	Pool		Under construction	30,000	(late 2023)		National Atomic Energy Commission	
RA-4	Rosario	Homog (S)		Operational	0.00	1972-01-01		National University of Rosario	
RA-2	Buenos Aires	Crit assembly		Decommissioned	0.03	1966-07-01		National Atomic Energy Commission	
RA-8	San Carlos de Bariloche	Crit assembly		Temporary shutdown	0.01	1997-06-17		National Atomic Energy Commission	
RA-1 Enrico Fermi	Buenos Aires	Tank		Operational	40	1958-01-20		National Atomic Energy Commission	
CAREM 25	Lima	Pwr propulsion		Under construction	100,000			National Atomic Energy Commission	
RA-6	San Carlos de Bariloche	Pool		Operational	500	1982-09-23		National Atomic Energy Commission	
RA-0	Córdoba	Tank		Operational	0.01	1965-01-01		National University of Córdoba	
RA-3	Ezeiza	Pool		Operational	10,000	1967-05-17		National Atomic Energy Commission	

== Australia ==
Name	Location	Type	Purpose	Status	Thermal power [kW]	Operation date	Closure date	Owner and operator	Notes
OPAL	Lucas Heights	Pool	See notes below table.	Operational	20,000	2006-08-12		ANSTO	LWR
CF	Lucas Heights	Crit assembly		Decommissioned	0.00	1973-03-01		ANSTO (formerly Australian Atomic Energy Commission)	
HIFAR	Lucas Heights	Heavy water		Permanent shutdown	10,000	1958-01-26	2007-01-30	ANSTO (formerly Australian Atomic Energy Commission)	DIDO class
MOATA	Lucas Heights	Argonaut		Decommissioned	100	1961-04-01	2009	ANSTO (formerly Australian Atomic Energy Commission)	Argonaut

Notes: The main uses of the current OPAL reactor are:

- Irradiation of target materials to produce radioisotopes for medical and industrial applications
- Research in the fields of materials science and structural biology using neutron beams and its sophisticated suite of experimental equipment
- Analysis of minerals and samples using the neutron activation technique and the delay neutron activation technique
- Irradiation of silicon ingots in order to dope them with phosphorus and produce the basic material used in the manufacturing of semiconductor devices

== Austria ==
Nuclear research reactors in Austria
Name	Location	Type	Purpose	Status	Thermal power [kW]	Operation date	Closure date	Owner and operator	Notes
ASTRA	Vienna	Pool		Decommissioned	10,000	1960-09-24	1999	Austrian Research Centers at Seibersdorf	
SAR-Graz	Graz	Argonaut		Decommissioned	10	1965-05-17	2004	Reactor Institute of the Technical Universities in Graz	
TRIGA II VIENNA	Vienna	TRIGA Mark II		Operational	250	1962-03-07		Atomic Institute of the Austrian Universities in Vienna	

== Bangladesh ==
Nuclear research reactors in Bangladesh
Name	Location	Type	Purpose	Status	Thermal power [kW]	Operation date	Closure date	Owner and operator	Notes
BTRR, BAEC TRIGA Research Reactor	Savar, Dhaka	TRIGA Mark II		Operational	3,000	1986-09-14		Atomic Energy Research Establishment (Bangladesh)	

== Belarus ==
Name	Location	Type	Purpose	Status	Thermal power [kW]	Operation date	Closure date	Owner and operator	Notes
IRT-M Minsk	Sosny, Minsk	Pool, irt		Decommissioned	5000	1962-04-01	1988		IRT research reactor
Kristal	Sosny, Minsk	Crit assembly		Extended shutdown	0				
YALINA-Thermal	Sosny, Minsk	Subcrit		Operational	0	2000-01-01			
Giacint	Sosny, Minsk	Crit assembly		Operational	0	2009-01-01			
YALINA-Booster	Sosny, Minsk	Subcrit		Operational	0	2005-05-30			
"Pamir"	Sosny, Minsk	Subcrit		Shut down			1986		mobile nuclear power reactor test

== Belgium ==
- GUINEVERE – fast, accelerator driven, lead-cooled reactor at SCK•CEN, Mol

Name	Location	Type	Purpose	Status	Thermal power [kW]	Operation date	Closure date	Owner and operator	Notes
VENUS-F	Mol	Crit assembly		Operational	0.10	1964-04-30			zero power critical facility, converted to GUINEVERE, at SCK•CEN, Mol
BR-1	Mol	Graphite		Operational	1,000	1956-05-11			4MWt air-cooled, graphite moderated research reactor at SCK•CEN, Mol
BR-2	Mol	Tank in pool		Operational	100,000	1961-06-29			125MWt water-cooled, beryllium moderated material testing research reactor at SCK•CEN, Mol
MYRRHA	Mol	Fast		Planned	85,000				
BR-3	Mol	Pwr power		Decommissioned	40,900	1962-08-29			11MWe PWR reactor (shut down and fully decommissioned) at SCK•CEN, Mol
BR-02, Mock-up of BR2	Mol	Pool		Decommissioned	0.50	1959-12-01			
THETIS RR-BN-1	Ghent	Pool		Decommissioned	250	1967-04-07			250kWt pool type reactor (shut down and fully decommissioned) at Ghent university (51°1′25.71″N 3°44′21.96″E)

== Brazil ==
Nuclear research reactors in Brazil
Name	Location	Type	Purpose	Status	Thermal power [kW]	Operation date	Closure date	Owner and operator	Notes
Argonauta	Rio de Janeiro	Argonaut		Operational	0.20	1965-02-20	-	IEN - Instituto de Engenharia Nuclear	
IEA-R1	São Paulo	Pool		Operational	6,000	1957-09-16	-	IPEN - Instituto de Pesquisas Energéticas e Nucleares	
TRIGA IPR-R1	Belo Horizonte	Pool (TRIGA Mark I)	Education, research, training and production of radioisotopes	Operational	100*	1960-11-06	-	CDTN - Centro de Desenvolvimento de Tecnologia Nuclear	*The expansion to 250 KW is in the licensing process, for which a new refrigeration system has been installed.
RMB - Reator Multipropósito Brasileiro	Iperó(CTMSP - Centro Tecnológico da Marinha em São Paulo)	Pool		Operational	35,000	1978-05-21	-	Amazul S.A.; CNEN - Comissão Nacional de Energia Nuclear	
IPEN/MB-01	São Paulo	Pool		Operational	0.10	1988-11-09	-	IPEN - Instituto de Pesquisas Energéticas e Nucleares	

== Bulgaria ==
Name	Location	Type	Purpose	Status	Thermal power [kW]	Operation date	Closure date	Owner and operator	Notes
IRT-Sofia	Sofia	Pool, irt		Permanent shutdown	2,000	1961-09-18	2009	Bulgarian Academy of Sciences	

== Canada ==
Nuclear research reactors in Canada
Name	Reactor type	Status	Capacity	Operation date	Closure	Operator and owner	Notes
MAPLE 1	Medical isotope production reactor	Finished; never entered service		2000	2008	Chalk River Laboratories	Incomplete commissioning, never completed testing. However, criticality was achieved
MAPLE 2	Medical isotope production reactor	Finished; never entered service		2003	2008	Chalk River Laboratories	Incomplete commissioning, never completed testing. However, criticality was achieved
NRU	Heavy water cooled/moderated	Shut down	135 MW	1957	2018	Chalk River Laboratories	
NRX	Heavy water moderated, light water cooled	Shut down	42 MW	1947	1993	Chalk River Laboratories	One of the highest flux reactors in the world until shut down
SLOWPOKE-1 prototype	Pool Type	Shut down	5 kW			Chalk River Laboratories, University of Toronto	The prototype was moved to the University of Toronto in 1971
PTR	Pool type	Shut down			1990	Chalk River Laboratories	
ZED-2		Operational	200 Wth	1960		Chalk River Laboratories	
ZEEP	Heavy water	Shut down	0	1945	1973	Chalk River Laboratories	The first nuclear reactor in Canada, and first outside the United States
WR-1	Organically cooled CANDU	Shut down		1965	1985	Whiteshell Laboratories	Coolant leak of 2,739 litres in Nov. 1978.
SLOWPOKE-3 demonstration	Pool type	Shut down	2 MWth	1987	1989	Whiteshell Laboratories	
SLOWPOKE-2	Pool type	Shut down	0	1981	2017 (start of decommissioning)	Saskatchewan Research Council	On 17 January 2018, the reactor surpassed 20,000 hours of operation.
SLOWPOKE-2	Pool type	Shut down	20 kW	1984	1989	Nordion	
SLOWPOKE-2 prototype	Pool type	Shut down	20 kW	1971		Tunney's Pasture	
SLOWPOKE-2	Pool type	Shut down	20 kW	1976		Dalhousie University	
SLOWPOKE-2	Pool type	Operational	0	1976		École Polytechnique de Montréal	
McMaster Nuclear Reactor	SLOWPOKE-2 pool type	Operational	5 MWth	1959		McMaster University	
SLOWPOKE-2	Pool type	Operational	20 kW	1985		Royal Military College	
SLOWPOKE-2	Pool type	Shut down	20 kW	1977	2017	University of Alberta	
SLOWPOKE-2	Pool type	Shut down	20 kW	1976	2001	University of Toronto	Rebuilt from SLOWPOKE-1

Name	Location	Type	Purpose	Status	Thermal power [kW]	Operation date	Closure date	Owner and operator	Notes
Ecole Polytechnique Subcritical Assembly	Montreal	Subcrit		Decommissioned	0.00	1974-01-01			
SLOWPOKE-2, Kanata	Ottawa	Slowpoke-2		Decommissioned	20	1984-06-06			
PTR	Chalk River	Pool		Decommissioned	0.10	1957-11-01			
SLOWPOKE-2, Halifax	Halifax	Slowpoke-2		Decommissioned	20	1976-07-08			
WR-1	Pinawa	Heavy water		Under decommissioning	60,000	1965-11-01			
SLOWPOKE-2, Toronto	Toronto	Slowpoke-2		Decommissioned	20	1971-06-05			
SLOWPOKE, Alberta	Edmonton	Slowpoke-2		Under decommissioning	20	1977-04-22			
ZEEP	Chalk River	Heavy water		Decommissioned	0.00	1945-09-01			
SLOWPOKE-2, RMC	Kingston	Slowpoke-2		Operational	20	1985-09-06			
NRU	Chalk River	Heavy water		Permanent shutdown	135,000	1957-11-03			
MAPLE 1	Chalk River	Tank in pool		Permanent shutdown	10,000				
MAPLE 2	Chalk River	Tank in pool		Permanent shutdown	10,000				
NRX	Chalk River	Heavy water		Permanent shutdown	42,000	1947-07-22			
SLOWPOKE-2, Montreal	Montreal	Slowpoke-2		Operational	20	1976-05-01			
SRC SLOWPOKE, Saskatchewan	Saskatoon	Slowpoke-2		Permanent shutdown	20	1981-03-01			
SDR SLOWPOKE Demo Reactor	Pinawa	Heating prot		Decommissioned	2,000	1987-07-15			
ZED-2	Chalk River	Tank		Operational	0.20	1960-09-07			
MNR McMaster University	Hamilton	Pool, mtr		Operational	3,000	1959-04-04			

== Chile ==
Name	Location	Type	Purpose	Status	Thermal power [kW]	Operation date	Closure date	Owner and operator	Notes
RECH-1	Santiago	Pool		Operational	5,000	1974-10-13		Chilean Nuclear Energy Commission (CChEN)	
RECH-2	Santiago	Pool		Extended shutdown	2,000	1989-09-06		Chilean Nuclear Energy Commission (CChEN)	Pool-type reactor, 10 MW MTR – Comisión Chilena de Energía Nuclear, Santiago (criticality 1977, refurbished 1989), currently in extended shutdown

== China ==
Name	Location	Type	Purpose	Status	Thermal power [kW]	Operation date	Closure date	Owner and operator	Notes
MNSR IAE	Beijing	Mnsr		Operational	27	1984-03-10			
IHNI-1	Beijing	Mnsr		Operational	30	2009-12-07			
ZPR Fast	Beijing	Crit fast		Extended shutdown	0.05	1970-06-29			
MNSR-SH	Shanghai	Mnsr		Decommissioned	30	1991-12-18			
MNSR-SD	Jinan	Mnsr		Decommissioned	33	1989-05-01			
HWRR-II	Beijing	Heavy water		Under decommissioning	15,000	1958-09-01			
VENUS-1	Beijing	Subcrit		Operational	0.00	2005-07-18			
CARR	Beijing	Tank in pool		Operational	60,000	2010-05-13			
CEFR	Beijing	Fast breeder		Operational	65,000	2010-07-21			Chinese experimental fast reactor (65 MW, 20 MWe, sodium cooled fast-spectrum neutron reactor). Located at CIAE Beijing, construction started May 2000, first criticality July 2010.
MNSR-SZ	Shenzhen	Mnsr		Operational	30	1988-11-01			
SPR IAE	Beijing	Pool		Operational	3,500	1964-12-20			
CMRR (China Mianyang Research Reactor)	Mianyang	Pool		Operational	20,000	2013-09-01			
HTR-10	Beijing	High temp gas		Operational	10,000	2000-12-21			
MJTR	Chengdu	Pool		Operational	5,000	1991-03-02			
ESR-901	Beijing	Pool-2 Cores		Operational	1,000	1964-10-01			
NHR-5	Beijing	Heating Prot		Operational	5,000	1989-11-03			
SPRR-300	Chengdu	Pool		Operational	3,000	1979-06-28			
HFETR Critical	Chengdu	Crit assembly		Operational	0.00	1979-06-20			
PPR PULSING	Chengdu	Pool, uzrh		Operational	1,000	1990-08-01			
HFETR	Chengdu	Tank		Operational	125,000	1979-12-27			
Zero Power Reactor	Chengdu	Crit assembly		Permanent shutdown	0.00	1966-01-01			
TMSR-SF1	Shanghai	Experimental		Planned	10,000				
TMSR-LF1	Shanghai	Experimental		Planned	2,000				
TFHR Thorium Pebble Bed	Shanghai	Experimental		Planned	2,000				

== Democratic Republic of the Congo ==
Name	Location	Type	Purpose	Status	Thermal power [kW]	Operation date	Closure date	Owner and operator	Notes
TRICO II	Kinshasa	Triga Mark II		Extended shutdown	1,000	1972-03-24		CREN-K University of Kinshasa	Extended shutdown since 2004
TRICO I	Kinshasa	Triga Mark I		Permanent shutdown	50	1959-06-06	1970;	CREN-K University of Kinshasa	

== Czech Republic ==
Name	Location	Type	Purpose	Status	Thermal power [kW]	Operation date	Closure date	Owner and operator	Notes
VR-1	Prague	Pool	Training reactor	Operational	0.50	1990-03-12		FNSPE CTU	
VR-2	Prague	Subcrit		Operational	0.00	2023-07-06		FNSPE CTU	
LVR-15	Řež	Tank wwr		Operational	10,000	1957-09-24			A VVR-SM type reactor
SR-0	Plzeň	Pool		Decommissioned	1.00	1971-01-01			
TR-0	Řež	Tank		Decommissioned	0.30	1972-01-01			
LR-0	Řež	Pool - Variable Core		Operational	5	1982-12-19			

== Denmark ==
Name	Location	Type	Purpose	Status	Thermal power [kW]	Operation date	Closure date	Owner and operator	Notes
DR-3	Roskilde	Heavy water		Under decommissioning	10,000	1960-01-16		Risø	DIDO class experimental reactor (shut down permanently in 2000)
DR-2	Roskilde	Pool		Decommissioned	5,000	1958-12-18	1975		
DR-1	Roskilde	Homog (L)		Decommissioned	2	1957-08-15	2001		

== Egypt ==
Name	Location	Type	Purpose	Status	Thermal power [kW]	Operation date	Closure date	Owner and operator	Notes
ETRR-1	Cairo	Tank wwr		Extended shutdown	2,000	1961-02-08		Nuclear Research Center at Inshas	
ETRR-2	Cairo	Pool		Operational	22,000	1997-11-27		Nuclear Research Center at Inshas	Built by Argentine INVAP

== Estonia ==
- Paldiski – 2 PWR naval training reactors (dismantled)

== Finland ==
Name	Location	Type	Purpose	Status	Thermal power [kW]	Operation date	Closure date	Owner and operator	Notes
FiR 1	Espoo	TRIGA Mark II		Under decommissioning	250	1962-03-27	2015	VTT Technical Research Centre of Finland	
SCA	Helsinki	Subcrit		Decommissioned	0.00	1963-07-30			

== France ==
Working:

- Azur at Cadarache
- Cabri at Cadarache
- Eole at Cadarache
- Masurca at Cadarache
- Minerve at Cadarache

Name	Location	Type	Purpose	Status	Thermal power [kW]	Operation date	Closure date	Owner and operator	Notes
Jules Horowitz Reactor	Saint-Paul-les-Durance	Tank in pool		Under construction	100,000				
Orphee	Saclay Nuclear Research Centre, Gif-sur-Yvette	Pool		Permanent shutdown	14,000	1980-12-19		Saclay Nuclear Research Centre	
Minerve	Saint-Paul-lès-Durance	Pool		Under decommissioning	0.10	1959-09-29			
Éole	Saint-Paul-lès-Durance	Tank in pool		Under decommissioning	1.00	1965-12-02			
Aquilon	Gif-sur-Yvette	Crit fast		Decommissioned	0.10	1956-08-11			
Osiris	Gif-sur-Yvette	Pool		Under decommissioning	70,000	1966-09-08			
Ulysse	Gif-sur-Yvette	Argonaut		Under decommissioning	100	1961-07-27			
Silene	Dijon	Homog (L)		Permanent shutdown	1.00	1974-01-01			
Mirene	Dijon	Homog (L)		Decommissioned	0.00	1975-01-01			
Strasbourg-Cronenbourg	Strasbourg	Argonaut		Decommissioned	100	1966-11-22			
Pegase	Saint-Paul-lès-Durance	Tank		Permanent shutdown	30,000	1963-04-01			
EL-2	Saclay	Tank		Decommissioned	2,500	1952-01-01			
Zoé (EL1)	Fontenay-aux-Roses	Heavy water		Decommissioned	150	1948-12-15			The first French nuclear reactor (1948)
Scarabee	Cadarache	Pool		Decommissioned	100,000	1982-01-01			
Phebus	Aix-en-Provence	Pool		Under decommissioning	38,000	1978-08-09			
Cabri	Saint-Paul-lès-Durance	Pool		Operational	25,000	1963-01-01			
ILL High Flux Reactor	Grenoble	Heavy water		Operational	58,300	1971-07-01		Institut Laue-Langevin	Réacteur à Haut Flux (RHF), currently the world's most intense source of neutrons and the source of the most intense neutron flux
Masurca	Saint-Paul-lès-Durance	Crit fast		Temporary shutdown	5	1966-12-14			
Isis	Saclay Nuclear Research Centre, Gif-sur-Yvette	Pool		Operational	700	1966-04-28		Saclay Nuclear Research Centre	
Harmonie	Saint-Paul-lès-Durance	Tank		Decommissioned	1.00	1965-08-01			
Rapsodie	Cadarache	Fast, power		Under decommissioning	40,000	1963-01-01			
Siloette	Grenoble	Pool		Decommissioned	100	1964-02-01			
Cesar	Saint-Paul-les-Durance	Crit assembly		Decommissioned	10	1964-12-01			
EL 4	Carhaix-Plouguer	Heavy water		Under decommissioning	267,000	1966-12-01			
Siloe	Grenoble	Pool		Decommissioned	35,000	1963-03-18			
Nereide	Fontenay-aux-Roses	Pool		Decommissioned	500	1960-09-15			
Marius	Saint-Paul-les-Durance	Crit assembly		Decommissioned	0.40	1960-01-01			
Triton	Fontenay-aux-Roses	Pool		Decommissioned	6,500	1959-06-29			
Melusine	Grenoble	Pool		Decommissioned	8,000	1958-07-01			
EL 3	Saclay	Heavy water		Decommissioned	18,000	1957-01-01			
Proserpine	Gif-sur-Yvette	Homog (L)		Decommissioned	0.00	1958-03-17			
Alecto	Gif-sur-Yvette	Homog (L)		Decommissioned	0.00	1961-01-01			
Peggy	Saint-Paul-les-Durance	Crit assembly		Decommissioned	1.00	1961-06-01			
Alizee	Gif-sur-Yvette	Crit assembly		Permanent shutdown	0.10	1959-06-18			
RNG New Generation Reactor	Saint-Paul-les-Durance	Bwr-prototype		Permanent shutdown	120,000	1975-11-24			
PHENIX	Marcoule	Fast breeder		Under decommissioning	563,000	1973-08-31			
G-1	Bagnols-sur-Cèze	Graphite pile		Under decommissioning	46,000	1956-01-07			
Rachel	Dijon	Crit fast		Decommissioned	0.10	1961-04-01			
Rubeole	Gif-sur-Yvette	Crit assembly		Decommissioned	0.10	1959-07-03			

== Georgia ==
Name	Location	Type	Purpose	Status	Thermal power [kW]	Operation date	Closure date	Owner and operator	Notes
IRT-M Tbilisi	Tbilisi	Pool, irt		Decommissioned	8,000	1959-10-01			

== Germany ==
- AKR II – Ausbildungskernreaktor II, Technische Universität Dresden; rating: 2 W, commissioned 2005
- AVR – Arbeitsgemeinschaft Versuchsreaktor, Forschungszentrum Jülich; rating: 15 MW, commissioned 1969; closed 1988
- BER II – Berliner-Experimentier-Reaktor II, Helmholtz-Zentrum Berlin für Materialien und Energie; rating: 10 MW, commissioned 1990, closed 2019
- FRG-1 (see GKSS Research Center) – Geesthacht; rating: 5 MW, commissioned 1958, closed 2010
- FRM II – Technical University of Munich; rating: 20 MW, commissioned 2004
- FRMZ – TRIGA of the University of Mainz, Institute of Nuclear Chemistry; continuous rating: 0.10 MW, pulse rating for 30ms: 250 MW; commissioned 1965
- FR2 - Forschungsreaktor 2; rating: 44 MW; commissioned 1957; closed: 1981
- SUR-FW "Neutron"; Hochschule Furtwangen University; type Siemens-Unterrichtsreaktor SUR-100; rating: 0.1 W; commissioned 1973
- SUR-S; University of Stuttgart; type Siemens-Unterrichtsreaktor SUR-100; rating: 0.1 W; commissioned 1964
- SUR-U; Ulm University of Applied Sciences; type Siemens-Unterrichtsreaktor SUR-100; rating: 0.1 W; commissioned 1965

=== Planned ===
- Wyhl, planned nuclear plant that was never built because of long-time resistance by the local population and environmentalists.

Name	Location	Type	Purpose	Status	Thermal power [kW]	Operation date	Closure date	Owner and operator	Notes
FRM II	Garching	Pool	neutron physics	Temporary shutdown	20,000	2004-03-02	-	Technical University of Munich	plans to restart in late 2025 after a five-year shutdown due to technical issues, pandemic delays, and legal disputes
FRM	Garching	Pool	neutron physics	Under decommissioning	4,000	1957-10-31	2000-07-28	Technical University of Munich	Germany's first research reactor
RFR	Dresden / Rossendorf	Tank wwr	Material testing and research, neutron irradiation	Decommissioned	10,000	1957-12-16	1991	Helmholtz-Zentrum Dresden-Rossendorf	
SUR Hannover	Hanover	Homog (S)	Training and education in nuclear technology	Decommissioned	0.00	1971-12-09		Hanover University	
BER-II	Berlin	Pool	Basic research with neutron beams, isotope production	Permanent shutdown	10,000	1973-12-09	2019	Helmholtz-Zentrum Berlin	
FRMZ	Mainz	Triga Mark Ii	Basic nuclear physics research, study of short-lived radionuclides	Operational	100	1965-08-03	-	Johannes Gutenberg University Mainz	
ANEX	Munich	Crit assembly	Experimental nuclear physics, subcritical assembly for research	Decommissioned	0.10	1964-05-01		Technical University of Munich	
FRF-1	Frankfurt am Main	Homog	Basic research, neutron irradiation	Decommissioned	50	1958-01-01	1982	University of Frankfurt	
SAR	Munich	Argonaut	Training and research, Argonaut-type reactor for education	Decommissioned	1.00	1959-06-01		Siemens	
BER-I	Berlin	Homog (L)	Basic research, predecessor to BER-II	Decommissioned	50	1958-07-24	1971	Helmholtz-Zentrum Berlin	
TRIGA HD I	Heidelberg	Triga Mark I	Research and training, medical isotope production	Decommissioned	250	1966-08-01	1977	University of Heidelberg	
ZLFR	Zittau	Tank	Training and education, zero-power reactor for teaching	Decommissioned	0.01	1979-05-25	2005	Zittau/Görlitz University of Applied Sciences	
AKR-2	Dresden	Homog (S)	Training, teaching, and research in nuclear engineering	Operational	0.00	1978-07-28	-	Technical University of Dresden	
RAKE	Dresden/Rossendorf	Tank	Critical assembly for research on reactor physics	Decommissioned	0.01	1969-10-03	1991	Helmholtz-Zentrum Dresden-Rossendorf	
RRR	Dresden/Rossendorf	Argonaut	Research on reactor physics and materials	Decommissioned	1.00	1962-12-16	1991	Helmholtz-Zentrum Dresden-Rossendorf	
STARK	Karlsruhe	Argonaut	Static critical assembly for reactor physics experiments	Decommissioned	0.01	1963-01-01		Karlsruhe Institute of Technology	
FRF-2	Frankfurt am Main	Triga conv	Basic research, neutron irradiation	Decommissioned	1,000	1977-10-01	1982	University of Frankfurt	
SUR Furtwangen	Furtwangen im Schwarzwald	Homog (S)	Training and education in radiation measurement and nuclear technology	Operational	0.00	1973-03-28	-	Furtwangen University	
KAHTER	Jülich	Crit assembly	Critical assembly for high-temperature reactor research	Decommissioned	0.10	1973-07-02	1988	Forschungszentrum Jülich	
KEITER	Jülich	Crit assembly	Critical assembly for reactor physics experiments	Decommissioned	0.00	1971-06-15	1988	Forschungszentrum Jülich	
FRH	Hanover	Triga Mark I	Research and training	Decommissioned	250	1973-01-31		University of Hanover	
AEG Nullenergie Reaktor	Karlstein am Main	Tank	Zero-power reactor for training and reactor physics experiments	Decommissioned	0.10	1967-06-01	1985	AEG	
ADIBKA (L77A)	Jülich	Homog (L)	Adiabatic critical assembly for reactor physics research	Decommissioned	0.10	1967-03-18	1988	Forschungszentrum Jülich	
SUR Bremen	Bremen	Homog (S)	Training and education in nuclear technology	Decommissioned	0.00	1967-10-10		Bremen University	
SUR Karlsruhe	Karlsruhe	Homog (S)	Training and education in nuclear technology	Decommissioned	0.00	1966-03-07		Karlsruhe Institute of Technology	
SUR Ulm	Ulm	Homog (S)	Training and education in nuclear technology	Operational	0.00	1965-12-01	-	Ulm University of Applied Sciences	
SUR Kiel	Kiel	Homog (S)	Training and education in nuclear technology	Decommissioned	0.00	1966-03-29		Kiel University	
SUR Hamburg	Hamburg	Homog (S)	Training and education in nuclear technology	Decommissioned	0.00	1965-01-06		Hamburg University of Applied Sciences	
SUR Aachen	Aachen	Homog (S)	Training and education in nuclear technology	Permanent shutdown	0.00	1965-09-22		RWTH Aachen University	
NS Otto Hahn	Geesthacht	Pwr propulsion	Research on nuclear propulsion for ships	Decommissioned	38,000	1968-08-26	1979	GKSS Research Center	
SNEAK	Karlsruhe	Homog (S)	Critical assemblies for fast reactor tests	Decommissioned	0.00	1966-12-01	1995	Karlsruhe Institute of Technology	series SNEAK-1 to SNEAK-10
TRIGA HD II	Heidelberg	Triga Mark I	Research and training, medical isotope production	Decommissioned	250	1978-02-28	1999	University of Heidelberg	
SUR Stuttgart	Stuttgart	Homog (S)	Training and education in nuclear technology	Operational	0.00	1964-04-24	-	University of Stuttgart	
FRG-2	Geesthacht	Pool	Material test reactor, irradiation tests for nuclear components	Under decommissioning	15,000	1963-03-15	1993	Helmholtz Centre Hereon	
SUR Munich	Munich	Homog (S)	Training and education in nuclear technology	Decommissioned	0.00	1962-02-01		Technical University of Munich	
PR-10 AEG Prüfreaktor	Karlstein am Main	Argonaut	Test reactor for nuclear engineering experiments	Decommissioned	0.18	1961-01-01	1985	AEG	
FRJ-1 (MERLIN)	Jülich	Pool, heavy water	Used for material irradiation	Decommissioned	10,000	1962-02-24	1985	Forschungszentrum Jülich	
FRJ-2 (DIDO)	Jülich	Heavy water	Prototype for material testing	Under decommissioning	23,000	1962-11-14	1983	Forschungszentrum Jülich	
FRG-1	Geesthacht	Pool	Research on nuclear ship propulsion, material research, isotope production	Under decommissioning	5,000	1958-10-23	2010	Helmholtz Centre Hereon	
SUR Berlin	Berlin	Homog (S)	Training and education in nuclear technology	Decommissioned	0.00	1963-07-01		Technical University of Berlin	
SUAK	Karlsruhe	Subcrit	Subcritical assembly for reactor physics research	Decommissioned	0.00	1964-11-20		Karlsruhe Institute of Technology	
SUR Darmstadt	Darmstadt	Homog (S)	Training and education in nuclear technology	Decommissioned	0.00	1963-09-01		Technical University of Darmstadt	
SUA	Munich	Subcrit		Decommissioned	0.00	1959-06-01		Technical University of Munich	
FR-2	Karlsruhe	Tank	Prototype boiling reactor	Under decommissioning	44,000	1961-03-07	1981	Karlsruhe Institute of Technology	
FRN	Munich	Triga Mark Iii	Isotope generation, beamline experiments in medical/biological research	Under decommissioning	1,000	1972-08-23	1982	Helmholtz Zentrum München	
FMRB	Braunschweig	Pool	Research and measurement reactor for neutron experiments	Under decommissioning	1,000	1967-10-03	1995	Physikalisch-Technische Bundesanstalt	

== Ghana ==
Name	Location	Type	Purpose	Status	Thermal power [kW]	Operation date	Closure date	Owner and operator	Notes
GHARR-1	Accra	Mnsr		Operational	30	1994-12-17			

== Greece ==
Name	Location	Type	Purpose	Status	Thermal power [kW]	Operation date	Closure date	Owner and operator	Notes
Demokritos (GRR-1)	Athens	Pool		Extended shutdown	5,000	1961-07-27		Demokritos National Centre for Scientific Research	;
NTU	Athens	Subcrit		Permanent shutdown	0.10	1970-10-10			
GR-B Subcritical Assembly	Thessaloniki	Subcrit		Operational	0.00	1971-08-04			

== Hungary ==
Name	Location	Type	Purpose	Status	Thermal power [kW]	Operation date	Closure date	Owner and operator	Notes
Budapest Research Reactor	Budapest	Tank wwr		Operational	10,000	1959-03-25		KFKI Atomic Energy Research Institute (see KFKI	) – (10 MW VVR-SM Budapest Research Reactor)
Nuclear Training Reactor	Budapest	Pool		Operational	100	1971-05-22		Technical University of Budapest (BME)	Institute of Nuclear Techniques – University Research Reactor
ZR-6M	NA	Crit assembly		Decommissioned	0.00	1972-11-28			

== India ==
- Bhabha Atomic Research Center (BARC) – Trombay
  - Apsara reactor – Asia's first nuclear reactor. 1 MW, pool type, light water moderated, enriched uranium fuel supplied by France
  - CIRUS reactor – 40 MW, supplied by Canada, heavy water moderated, uses natural uranium fuel
  - Dhruva reactor – 100 MW, heavy water moderated, uses natural uranium fuel
  - Purnima series
- Indira Gandhi Center for Atomic Research (IGCAR) – Kalpakkam
  - PFBR – 500MWe Sodium cooled fast breeder nuclear reactor, under construction. Expected completion 2015.
  - FBTR – 40 MW Fast Breeder Test Reactor, uses mixed (plutonium and uranium) carbide fuel
  - KAMINI –30 kW, uses U-233 fuel

Name	Location	Type	Purpose	Status	Thermal power [kW]	Operation date	Closure date	Owner and operator	Notes
PURNIMA-III	Mumbai	Tank		Decommissioned	0.00	1990-09-11			
Apsara	Mumbai	Pool		Decommissioned	1,000	1956-08-04			
Apsara-U	Mumbai	Pool		Operational	2,000	2018-09-10			
High Flux RR	Visakhapatnam	Pool		Planned	40,000				
Critical Facility for AHWR and PHWR	Mumbai	Tank		Operational	0.10	2008-04-07			
Dhruva	Mumbai	Heavy water		Operational	100,000	1985-08-08			
CIRUS	Mumbai	Heavy water		Permanent shutdown	40,000	1960-07-10			
KAMINI	Kalpakkam	U-233 fuelled		Operational	30	1996-10-29			
FBTR	Kalpakkam	Fast breeder		Operational	40,000	1985-10-18			
PURNIMA-II	Mumbai	Homog (L)		Decommissioned	0.01	1984-05-10			
PURNIMA	Mumbai	Fast		Decommissioned	0.00	1972-05-01			
ZERLINA	Kalpakkam	Tank		Decommissioned	0.10	1961-01-01			
Thermal RR	Visakhapatnam	Pool		Planned	125,000				

== Indonesia ==
Name	Location	Type	Purpose	Status	Thermal power [kW]	Operation date	Closure date	Owner and operator	Notes
RSG-GAS	South Tangerang	Pool, mtr		Operational	30,000	1987-07-29			SIWABESSY 30MWh Multi-Purpose Reactor (installed 1987)
KARTINI-PSTA	Sleman	TRIGA Mark II		Operational	100	1979-01-25			
TRIGA Mark II, Bandung	Bandung	TRIGA Mark II		Operational	2,000	1964-10-19			2MW installed 1997

== Iran ==
- Tehran – AMF reactor at Tehran Nuclear Research Center (supplied by USA, 1967)
- Isfahan, Nuclear Technology Center (mainly supplied by China)
  - MNSR – 27 kW miniature neutron source reactor
  - light water subcritical reactor (LWSCR)
  - heavy water zero power reactor (HWZPR)
  - graphite subcritical reactor (GSCR)
- Arak – IR-40 heavy water-moderated reactor (under construction, planned commissioning 2014)

Name	Location	Type	Purpose	Status	Thermal power [kW]	Operation date	Closure date	Owner and operator	Notes
ENTC LWSCR	Isfahan	Subcrit		Operational	0.00	1992-01-01			
Tehran Research Reactor (TRR)	Tehran	Pool		Operational	5,000	1967-11-01			
ENTC HWZPR	Isfahan	Crit assembly		Operational	0.10	1995-06-01			
ENTC MNSR	Isfahan	Mnsr		Operational	30	1994-03-01			
ENTC GSCR	Isfahan	Subcrit		Decommissioned	0.00	1992-01-01			

== Iraq ==
Name	Location	Type	Purpose	Status	Thermal power [kW]	Operation date	Closure date	Owner and operator	Notes
TAMMUZ-1	Baghdad	Pool		Permanent shutdown	40,000	1987-03-01			40 MW thermal tank-pool research reactor(OSIRIS reactor). Destroyed in Operation Scorch Sword and Operation Opera (Supplied, fueled and serviced by France.)
TAMMUZ-2	Baghdad	Pool		Permanent shutdown	500	1987-03-01			500 KW ISIS neutron modelling module. Destroyed in Operation Desert Storm and Operation Iraqi Liberation (Supplied, fueled and serviced by France.)
IRT-5000	Baghdad	Pool, irt		Permanent shutdown	5,000	1967-01-01			Destroyed in Operation Desert Storm and Operation Iraqi Liberation (supplied by The Soviet Union)

Note: Tamuz-1 and Tamuz-2 are parts of the same French nuclear research complex design, the OSIRIS research complex. All three reactors were located at the same site.

== Israel ==
Name	Location	Type	Purpose	Status	Thermal power [kW]	Operation date	Closure date	Owner and operator	Notes
IRR-1	Yavne	Pool		Operational	5,000	1960-06-16		Soreq Nuclear Research Center	5 MW light water research reactor (supplied by USA, operational 1960)
IRR-2	Yavne	Heavy water		Operational	26,000	1963-12-01		Negev Nuclear Research Center	EL-102 uranium/heavy water research reactor, 50-75 MWt (supplied by France, operational 1964, not under IAEA safeguards)

== Italy ==
- Brasimone (Bologna) – PEC (Prove Esperimenti Combustibile - Fuel Test Experiments): ENEA Ente Nazionale Energia Atomica - National Atomic Energy Agency - Brasimone Research Center (1972–1987)
- Ispra (Varese) – ISPRA-1 (5 MW): European Commission Joint Research Centre (1959–1973)
- Ispra (Varese) – ECO (Essai Critique ORGEL, 1 kW): European Commission Joint Research Centre (1966–1983)
- Ispra (Varese) – ESSOR (ESSai ORrganique eau lourde, 25MW): European Commission Joint Research Centre (1967–1983)
- Legnaro (Padova) - RTS-1: INFN Istituto Nazionale di Fisica Nucleare - National Institute for Nuclear Physic (1963–1980)
- Milan - L-54 (50 kW): CeSNEF Centro Studi Nucleari "Enrico Fermi" - Politecnico di Milano (1957–1979)
- Montecuccolino (Bologna) - RB-1 (zero-power reactor): University of Bologna (1962–1985)
- Montecuccolino (Bologna) - RB-2 (1 kW): University of Bologna (1964–1985)
- Montecuccolino (Bologna) - RB-3 - Aquilone 11 (1 kW): University of Bologna (1971–1989)
- Pavia – TRIGA LENA (TRIGA Mk.II model, 250 kW): University of Pavia (1965 - operational)
- Palermo - AGN-201 "Costanza" (zero-power reactor): University of Palermo (1960 – operational)
- Saluggia (Vercelli) - AVOGADRO RS-1 ("Swimming Pool" model): FIAT/Montecatini (1959–1971)
- San Piero a Grado (Pisa) – RTS-1 "Galileo Galilei" ("Swimming Pool" model, 5MW): CAMEN Centro Applicazioni Militari Energia Nucleare - Center for Military Applications of Nuclear Energy (1963–1980)
- Santa Maria di Galeria (Roma) – ROSPO-2 (2 kW): ENEA Ente Nazionale Energia Atomica - Casaccia Research Center (1960–1975)
- Santa Maria di Galeria (Roma) – TRIGA RC-1 (modified TRIGA Mk.II model, 1MW): ENEA Ente Nazionale Energia Atomica - Casaccia Research Center (1960–1987, reactivated 2010)
- Santa Maria di Galeria (Roma) – RC-4 RITMO (0.01 kW): ENEA Ente Nazionale Energia Atomica - Casaccia Research Center (1965–1978)
- Santa Maria di Galeria (Roma) – RANA (10 kW): ENEA Ente Nazionale Energia Atomica - Casaccia Research Center (1965–1981)
- Santa Maria di Galeria (Roma) – TAPIRO (modified Argonne Fast Source Reactor model, 5 kW): ENEA Ente Nazionale Energia Atomica - Casaccia Research Center (1971–1987, reactivated 2010)

Name	Location	Type	Purpose	Status	Thermal power [kW]	Operation date	Closure date	Owner and operator	Notes
RSV TAPIRO	Rome	Fast source		Operational	5	1971-04-04			
RANA	Rome	Pool		Decommissioned	10	1965-02-15			
RB-3	Bologna	Zero power D2O		Decommissioned	0.10	1971-08-09			
TRIGA RC-1	Rome	Triga Mark Ii		Operational	1,000	1960-06-11			
LENA, TRIGA II PAVIA	Pavia	Triga Mark Ii		Operational	250	1965-11-15			
ISPRA-1	Ispra	Heavy water		Permanent shutdown	5,000	1959-03-24			
SM-1 Subcritical Assembly	Pavia	Subcrit		Operational	0.00	1961-01-01			
ROSPO 2	Rome	Pool		Decommissioned	0.20	1963-01-01			
Struttura Sottocritica	Padua	Subcrit		Decommissioned	0.00	1962-01-01			
L-54M	Milan	Homog (L)		Under decommissioning	50	1959-11-20			
RB-2	Bologna	Argonaut		Decommissioned	10	1963-05-28			
AGN-201 Costanza	Palermo	Homog (S)		Operational	0.02	1960-02-12			
RITMO Reactor (RC-4)	Rome	Pool		Decommissioned	0.01	1965-07-08			
Galileo Galilei RTS-1	Pisa	Pool		Decommissioned	5,000	1963-04-04			
RB-1	Bologna	Crit graphite		Decommissioned	20	1962-07-01			
Avogadro RS-1	Saluggia	Pool, mtr		Decommissioned	5,000	1959-09-10			
ECO (Orgel Critical Experiment)	Ispra	Crit fast		Under decommissioning	2	1965-11-01			
ESSOR Nuclear Plant	Ispra	Heavy water		Under decommissioning	43,000	1967-03-19			

== Jamaica ==
Name	Location	Type	Purpose	Status	Thermal power [kW]	Operation date	Closure date	Owner and operator	Notes
UWI CNS SLOWPOKE	Mona	SLOWPOKE-2 reactor		Operational	20	1984-03-13			

== Japan ==
- Japan Atomic Energy Agency (JAEA) Reactors
  - Tōkai JRR-2 (shut down)
  - Tōkai JRR-3
  - Tōkai JRR-4
  - Tōkai JPDR (Japan Power Demonstration Reactor, shut down)
  - Ōarai High-temperature engineering test reactor (HTTR)
  - Ōarai JMTR (Japan Materials Testing Reactor)
  - Naka JT-60 fusion reactor
  - Nuclear Safety Research Reactor
  - Fugen (ATR (Advanced Thermal Reactor), shut down)
  - Jōyō (FBR)
  - Monju (FBR)
- Kinki University
  - UTR-KINKI
- Kyoto University
  - KUR
- Musashi Institute of Technology (Tokyo City University)
  - MITRR (TRIGA-II) (shut down 1990)
- Rikkyo University
  - RUR (TRIGA-II) (shut down)
- University of Tokyo
  - Yayoi (shut down)

Name	Location	Type	Purpose	Status	Thermal power [kW]	Operation date	Closure date	Owner and operator	Notes
TCA Tank Critical Assembly	Tōkai, Ibaraki	Crit assembly		Under decommissioning	0.20	1962-08-23		Japan Atomic Energy Agency (JAEA)	
FCA	Tōkai, Ibaraki	Crit fast		Under decommissioning	2	1967-04-29		Japan Atomic Energy Agency (JAEA)	
TRACY	Tōkai, Ibaraki	Pulsing		Under decommissioning	10	1995-12-20		Japan Atomic Energy Agency (JAEA)	
STACY	Tōkai, Ibaraki	Crit assembly		Temporary shutdown	0.20	1995-02-23		Japan Atomic Energy Agency (JAEA)	
JMTR	Oarai	Tank		Permanent shutdown	50,000	1968-03-30		Japan Atomic Energy Agency (JAEA)	
Toshiba NCA	Kawasaki	Crit assembly		Temporary shutdown	0.20	1963-12-11			
JRR-4	Tokai Mura	Pool		Under decommissioning	3,500	1965-01-28		Japan Atomic Energy Agency (JAEA)	
JOYO	Oarai	Fast, Na cooled		Temporary shutdown	140,000	1977-04-24		Japan Atomic Energy Agency (JAEA)	
KUR	Osaka	Tank		Operational	5,000	1964-06-25			
KUCA	Osaka	Crit assembly		Operational	0.10	1974-08-06			
HTTR	Oarai	High temp gas		Operational	30,000	1998-10-11		Japan Atomic Energy Agency (JAEA)	
JRR-3	Tōkai, Ibaraki	Heavy water		Decommissioned	10,000	1962-01-01		Japan Atomic Energy Agency (JAEA)	
NSRR	Tōkai, Ibaraki	Triga Acpr		Operational	300	1975-06-30			
YAYOI	Tokyo	Fast source		Under decommissioning	2	1971-04-10			
DCA	Tokyo	Crit assembly		Under decommissioning	1.00	1969-12-28			
JMTRC	NA	Pool		Decommissioned	0.10	1965-10-01			
Musashi Reactor	Tokyo	Triga Mark Ii		Under decommissioning	100	1963-01-30			
JRR-3M	Tokai	Pool		Operational	20,000	1990-03-22			
TTR	Tokyo	Pool		Under decommissioning	100	1962-03-13			
HTR	Tokyo	Pool		Under decommissioning	100	1961-12-25			
TRIGA-II Rikkyo	Yokosuka	TRIGA Mark II		Under decommissioning	100	1961-12-08			
UTR KINKI	Osaka	Argonaut		Operational	0.00	1961-11-11			
JRR-2	Tōkai, Ibaraki	Tank		Under decommissioning	10,000	1960-10-01		Japan Atomic Energy Agency (JAEA)	
VHTRC	Tōkai, Ibaraki	Crit assembly		Decommissioned	0.01	1985-05-13		Japan Atomic Energy Agency (JAEA)	
OCF Ozenji Critical Facility	Kawasaki	Crit assembly		Decommissioned	0.10	1962-10-01			
MCF	Saitama	Crit assembly		Decommissioned	0.20	1969-08-01			
JRR-1	Tōkai, Ibaraki	Homog (L)		Decommissioned	60	1957-08-27		Japan Atomic Energy Agency (JAEA)	Japan Research Unit No. 1, shut down
SCA	Tōkai, Ibaraki	Crit assembly		Decommissioned	0.20	1966-08-01		Japan Atomic Energy Agency (JAEA)	
AHCF	Tōkai, Ibaraki	Crit assembly		Decommissioned	0.01	1961-01-01		Japan Atomic Energy Agency (JAEA)	

== Jordan ==
Name	Location	Type	Purpose	Status	Thermal power [kW]	Operation date	Closure date	Owner and operator	Notes
JRTR	Amman	Tank in pool		Operational	5,000	2016-04-25		Jordan University of Science and Technology (JUST) – Ar Ramtha	Jordan's first nuclear reactor, 5 MW research reactor, supplied by South Korea, first critical 2015, operational 2016.
JSA - Jordan Subcritical Assembly	Amman	Subcrit		Operational	0.00	2013-06-07		Jordan University of Science and Technology (JUST) – Ar Ramtha	

== Kazakhstan ==
Name	Location	Type	Purpose	Status	Thermal power [kW]	Operation date	Closure date	Owner and operator	Notes
IGR	Kurchatov	Graphite, pulse		Operational	0.00	1960-06-01		National Nuclear Center, Semipalatinsk Test Site	(Impulse Graphite Reactor)
WWR-K Almaty	Almaty	Pool		Operational	6,000	1967-10-22		Institute of Nuclear Physics of the National Nuclear Center	VVR-K – 10 MWe reactor
RA	Kurchatov	Tank		Permanent shutdown	500	1987-01-01		National Nuclear Center, Semipalatinsk Test Site	zirconium hydride moderated reactor (dismantled)
IVG.1M	Kurchatov	Pwr		Operational	35,000	1972-09-19		National Nuclear Center, Semipalatinsk Test Site	
WWR-K CF	Almaty	Crit assembly		Operational	0.10	1972-12-01		Institute of Nuclear Physics of the National Nuclear Center	

== Latvia ==
Name	Location	Type	Purpose	Status	Thermal power [kW]	Operation date	Closure date	Owner and operator	Notes
SRR Salaspils Research Reactor	Salaspils	Pool		Under decommissioning	5,000	1961-09-26		Salaspils, Nuclear Research Center	
RKS-25	Salaspils	Pool		Permanent shutdown	0.03	1966-09-15		Salaspils, Nuclear Research Center	

== Libya ==
Name	Location	Type	Purpose	Status	Thermal power [kW]	Operation date	Closure date	Owner and operator	Notes
IRT-1	Tajoura	Pool, irt		Temporary shutdown	10,000	1981-08-28		Tajura Nuclear Research Center, REWDRC	(see ) – 10 MW research reactor (supplied by the USSR)
TNRC Critical Facility	Tajoura	Crit assembly		Operational	0.10				

== Malaysia ==
Name	Location	Type	Purpose	Status	Thermal power [kW]	Operation date	Closure date	Owner and operator	Notes
TRIGA Puspati (RTP)	Kajang, Kuala Lumpur	TRIGA Mark II		Operational	1,000	1982-06-28		Malaysian Institute of Nuclear Technology Research	

== Mexico ==
Name	Location	Type	Purpose	Status	Thermal power [kW]	Operation date	Closure date	Owner and operator	Notes
Nuclear Chicago Mod 9000	Mexico City	Subcrit		Operational	0.00	1969-01-01		National Polytechnic Institute	"Nuclear-Chicago Modelo 9000" subcritical research reactor
Chicago Modelo 9000	Zacatecas	Subcrit		Extended shutdown	0.00	1969-05-14		Autonomous University of Zacatecas	
TRIGA Mark III	La Marquesa Ocoyoacac	TRIGA Mark III		Operational	1,000	1968-11-08		National Institute for Nuclear Research	
SUR-100 UNAM	Mexico City	Homog (S)		Decommissioned	0.00	1972-09-22			

== Morocco ==
Name	Location	Type	Purpose	Status	Thermal power [kW]	Operation date	Closure date	Owner and operator	Notes
MA-R1	Rabat	TRIGA Mark II		Operational	2,000	2007-05-02			

== Netherlands ==
Name	Location	Type	Purpose	Status	Thermal power [kW]	Operation date	Closure date	Owner and operator	Notes
HOR	Delft	Pool		Operational	2,300	1963-04-25		Reactor Institute Delft, part of Delft University of Technology	
HFR	Petten	Tank in pool		Operational	45,000	1961-11-09		Owned: JRC Petten; Operated: NRG	
PALLAS	Petten	Na		Planned	0.00			Owned: JRC Petten; Operated: NRG	
LFR	Schagen	Argonaut		Under decommissioning	30	1960-09-28	2010	Owned: JRC Petten; Operated: NRG	
KRITO	Petten	Crit assembly		Decommissioned	0.10	1963-03-29		Owned: JRC Petten; Operated: NRG	
BARN	Wageningen	Pool		Decommissioned	100	1963-04-01	1980	Wageningen University	
ATHENE	Eindhoven	Argonaut		Decommissioned	10	1969-02-03	1973	Eindhoven University of Technology	
KSTR	Arnhem	Aqueous breeder		Decommissioned	1,000	1974-05-22	2003	KEMA	
Delphi	Delft	Subcrit		Operational	0.00			Reactor Institute Delft, part of Delft University of Technology	

== Nigeria ==
Name	Location	Type	Purpose	Status	Thermal power [kW]	Operation date	Closure date	Owner and operator	Notes
NIRR-1	Zaria	Mnsr		Operational	30	2004-02-03			
Multipurpose Research Reactor	Abuja	Pool		Operational	10,000	2010-06-15			

== North Korea ==
Name	Location	Type	Purpose	Status	Thermal Power [kW]	Operation Date	Closure Date	Owner and Operator	Notes
IRT-2000	Yongbyon	Heavy-water moderated research reactor		Operational	8,000	1965			(supplied by USSR, 1965), 8 MW (2 MW 1965–1974, 4 MW 1974–1986), Not under IAEA safeguards
Yongbyon 1	Yongbyon		Magnox	Shut down	5,000	1987	2007		5 MWe Magnox reactor, provides power and district heating (active 1987–1994, reactivated 2003, and shut-down in July 2007), Not under IAEA safeguards

== Norway ==
Name	Location	Type	Purpose	Status	Thermal power [kW]	Operation date	Closure date	Owner and operator	Notes
JEEP II	Kjeller	Tank		Permanent shutdown	2,000	1966-12-01	2018	Institute for Energy Technology (IFE)	
HBWR (Halden boiling water reactor)	Halden	Heavy water		Permanent shutdown	20,000	1959-06-29	2018	Institute for Energy Technology (IFE)	
NORA	Kjeller	Crit assembly		Decommissioned	0.05	1961-01-01	1967	Institute for Energy Technology (IFE)	
JEEP I	Kjeller	Heavy water		Decommissioned	450	1951-06-01	1967	Institute for Energy Technology (IFE)	

== Pakistan ==
Name	Location	Type	Purpose	Status	Thermal power [kW]	Operation date	Closure date	Owner and operator	Notes
Under IAEA safeguards
PARR-I	Islamabad	MTR/Pool		Operational	10,000	1965-12-21		PINSTECH	
PARR-ll	Islamabad	MNSR/Pool		Operational	30	1989-11-02		PINSTECH	
PARR-lll	Islamabad	Pool		Under construction	10,000			PINSTECH	
Not under IAEA safeguards
Khushab-I	Khushab District	HWR		Operational	Classified. Estimated: 50,000-70,000.	1998		KNC	
Khushab-II	Khushab District	HWR		Operational	Classified. Estimated: 50,000-70,000.	2010		KNC	
Khushab-III	Khushab District	HWR		Operational	Classified. Estimated: 50,000-70,000.	2013		KNC	
Khushab-IV	Khushab District	HWR		Operational	Classified. Estimated: 50,000-70,000.	2015		KNC	
Khushab-V	Khushab District	HWR		Under construction	Classified. Estimated: 50,000-70,000.			KNC	

== Panama ==
- USS Sturgis - floating nuclear power plant for Panama Canal (operating 1966 to 1976)

== Peru ==
Name	Location	Type	Purpose	Status	Thermal power [kW]	Operation date	Closure date	Owner and operator	Notes
RP-10	Lima	Pool		Operational	10,000	1988-11-30			10 MW pool-type material test reactor, located in Huarangal built by Argentine INVAP. First criticality in 1989.
RP-0	Lima	Crit assembly		Operational	0.00	1978-07-20			1 W critical assembly, located in Lima, built by Argentine INVAP. First criticality in 1978.

== Philippines ==
Name	Location	Type	Purpose	Status	Thermal power [kW]	Operation date	Closure date	Owner and operator	Notes
PRR-1	Quezon City	Subcrit		Operational	0.00				3 MW TRIGA-converted reactor, Quezon City. Managed by the Philippine Nuclear Research Institute (formerly Philippine Atomic Energy Commission). 1st criticality in August 1963, reactor conversion in March 1984, criticality after conversion in April 1988, shut down since 1988 for pool repairs, on extended shutdown at present.

== Poland ==
- Ewa reactor - 10 MW VVR-SM research reactor (dismantled in 1995)
- Maria reactor - 30 MW research reactor
- Anna reactor - 10 kW research reactor (dismantled)
- Agata reactor - 10 W zero-power research reactor (dismantled)
- Maryla reactor - 100 W zero-power research reactor (dismantled)
- UR-100 reactor - 100 kW training reactor (dismantled)

Name	Location	Type	Purpose	Status	Thermal power [kW]	Operation date	Closure date	Owner and operator	Notes
MARIA	Otwock	Pool		Operational	30,000	1974-12-18		National Center for Nuclear Research	
HELENA	Otwock	Subcrit		Decommissioned	0.00	1963-09-02			
AGATA	Otwock	Pool		Decommissioned	0.10	1973-05-05			
PANNA	Otwock	Crit assembly		Decommissioned	0.10	1963-01-01			
MARYLA	Otwock	Pool		Decommissioned	100	1963-12-29			
EWA	Otwock	Tank wwr		Under decommissioning	10,000	1958-06-14			

== Portugal ==
Name	Location	Type	Purpose	Status	Thermal power [kW]	Operation date	Closure date	Owner and operator	Notes
RPI	Lisbon	Pool		Permanent shutdown	1,000	1961-04-25		Instituto Tecnológico e Nuclear	

== Puerto Rico ==
- Mayagüez - TRIGA reactor (dismantled)
- Boiling Nuclear Superheater (BONUS) Reactor Facility, BONUS - superheated BWR (decommissioned). Listed on the U.S. National Register of Historic Places.

== Romania ==
- Institute for Nuclear Research, Mioveni, 110 km northwest of Bucharest - TRIGA reactor (capable consisting of either a 500 kW pulse ACPR core, or a 14 MW steady state core)
- National Institute for Research and Isotopic Separation, Govora, 170 km west of Bucharest - no research reactors, but instead devoted to heavy water production
- National Institute for Physics and Nuclear Engineering, IFIN-HH, Mǎgurele, 5 km southwest of Bucharest - a 2 MW VVR-S research reactor (shut down in April 2002, with decommissioning/dismantling started in 2013)

Name	Location	Type	Purpose	Status	Thermal power [kW]	Operation date	Closure date	Owner and operator	Notes
TRIGA II Pitești - SS Core	Pitești	Triga Ddal core		Operational	14,000	1980-02-02			
TRIGA II Pitești - Pulsed	Pitești	Triga dual core		Operational	500	1980-02-02			
HELEN	Bucharest	Subcrit		Decommissioned	0.00	1969-01-01			
VVR-S Bucharest	Bucharest	Tank wwr		Under decommissioning	2,000	1957-07-01			
RP-01	Bucharest	Tank		Decommissioned	0.00	1976-02-01			

== Russia ==
A total of 98 nuclear research facilities, including:

- T-15 fusion reactor at Kurchatov Institute
- VVR-M 18 MW reactor at St. Petersburg Institute of Nuclear Physics
- IBR-2 2 MW pulsed reactor at Joint Institute for Nuclear Research
- SM, Arbus (ACT-1), MIR.M1, RBT-6, RBT-10 / 1, RBT-10 / 2, BOR-60 and VK-50 Research Institute of Atomic Reactors

Name	Location	Type	Purpose	Status	Thermal power [kW]	Operation date	Closure date	Owner and operator	Notes
Stend-7	Electrostal	Crit assembly		Decommissioned	0.70	1979-01-01			
FS-2	Moscow	Subcrit		Permanent shutdown	0.20	1972-10-17			
WWR-M	Gatchina	Tank wwr		Extended shutdown	18,000	1959-12-29			
PIK Physical Model	Gatchina	Crit assembly		Operational	0.10	1983-12-26			
PIK	Saint Petersburg	Tank		Under construction	100,000				
BFS-1	Obninsk	Crit assembly		Operational	0.20	1962-02-20			
659-L	Nizhny Novgorod	Crit assembly		Decommissioned	0.00	1979-01-01			
Stend-6	Electrostal	Crit assembly		Decommissioned	0.05	1968-01-01			
Stend-3	Electrostal	Crit assembly		Decommissioned	2	1967-01-01			
Stend-2	Electrostal	Crit assembly		Decommissioned	2	1969-01-01			
Stend-1	Electrostal	Crit assembly		Decommissioned	2	1966-01-01			
SGO	Obninsk	Crit assembly		Decommissioned	0.10	1969-01-01			
RF-GS	Obninsk	Crit assembly		Decommissioned	0.01	1962-01-01			
COBRA	Obninsk	Crit assembly		Decommissioned	0.30	1970-01-01			
BR-1	Obninsk	Crit assembly		Decommissioned	0.05	1965-01-01			
AMBF-2	Obninsk	Crit assembly		Decommissioned	0.10	1984-11-22			
STRELA	Obninsk	Crit assembly		Decommissioned	0.02	1968-08-14			
BFS-2	Obninsk	Crit assembly		Operational	1.00	1969-09-30			
BARS-6	Obninsk	Prompt burst		Operational	10	1994-12-30			
FG-5	Obninsk	Crit assembly		Decommissioned	0.10	1967-01-01			
27/VT	Obninsk	Fast, power		Under decommissioning	70,000	1959-01-01			
TOPAZ	Obninsk	Space test		Decommissioned	150	1966-01-01			
BR-10	Obninsk	Loop type		Permanent shutdown	8,000	1958-06-01			
Stend-5	Electrostal	Crit assembly		Operational	0.30	1967-04-20			
IIN-3M	Moscow	Prompt burst		Decommissioned	0.00	1972-01-01			
TOPAZ-II (YENISEY)	Moscow	Space test		Decommissioned	135	1967-01-01			
Stend-4	Electrostal	Crit assembly		Operational	0.03	1967-04-20			
AM-1	Obninsk	Graphite		Under decommissioning	10,000	1954-06-15			
BARS-3M	Moscow	Prompt burst		Decommissioned	0.00	1988-01-01			
27/VM	Obninsk	Pwr power		Under decommissioning	70,000	1956-03-01			
659	Nizhny Novgorod	Crit assembly		Operational	0.10	1963-06-15			
1125	Nizhny Novgorod	Crit assembly		Operational	0.60	1975-11-17			
TIBR-1M	Moscow	Prompt burst		Decommissioned	0.00	1976-01-01			
IFR (IBR-1)	Moscow	Fast		Decommissioned	6	1960-06-01			
IBR-30	Dubna	Fast, pulsed		Decommissioned	25	1969-01-01			
BARS-2	Moscow	Prompt burst		Decommissioned	0.00	1971-01-01			
IR-50	Moscow	Pool		Permanent shutdown	50	1961-02-20			
WWR-TS	Obninsk	Tank wwr		Operational	15,000	1964-11-04			
IBR-2M	Dubna	Fast, pulsed		Operational	2,000	1978-12-15			
BARS-4	Moscow	Prompt burst		Temporary shutdown	10	1980-06-03			
IRV-2M	Moscow	Pool		Under construction	4,000	1974-12-28			
SM-3	Dimitrovgrad	Pressure vessel		Operational	100,000	1961-01-10			
Gidra (Hydra)	Moscow	Homog (L)		Operational	10	1971-11-24			
Argus	Moscow	Homog (L)		Operational	20	1981-11-02			
IKAR-S	Sarov	Crit graphite		Operational	0.10	2008-12-01			
BIGR	Sarov	Fast, pulsed		Operational	500	1977-03-31			
GIR-2	Sarov	Fast, pulsed		Operational	1.00	1993-04-12			
FKBN-2	Snezhinsk	Crit fast		Operational	0.10	2000-01-01			
FKBN-2M	Sarov	Crit fast		Operational	0.00	2001-03-02			
IRT-2000	Moscow	Tank		Decommissioned	2,000	1957-11-23			
BR-1M	Sarov	Fast, pulsed		Operational	5	1979-01-01			
IRT-MEPhI	Moscow	Pool, irt		Extended shutdown	2,500	1967-05-26			
BR-K1	Sarov	Fast, pulsed		Operational	10	1995-11-30			
IVV-2M	Zarechniy	Pool		Operational	15,000	1966-04-23			
MBIR	Dimitrovgrad	Fast, power		Under construction	150,000				
Stend T-2	Obninsk	Space test		Decommissioned	0.00	1970-01-01			
VRL-03	Moscow	Pool		Decommissioned	100	1961-01-01			
VRL-02	Moscow	Pool		Decommissioned	100	1959-01-01			
S111	Moscow	Crit assembly		Decommissioned	0.00				
1120	Nizhny Novgorod	Crit assembly		Decommissioned	0.00	1975-01-01			
MER	Saint Petersburg	Crit assembly		Permanent shutdown	0.20	1970-01-01			
G-1	Saint Petersburg	Crit assembly		Permanent shutdown	0.20	1964-01-01			
FM SM-3	Dimitrovgrad	Crit assembly		Operational	0.02	1970-01-01			
FM MIR.M1	Dimitrovgrad	Crit assembly		Operational	0.01	1966-10-30			
Narciss-M2	Moscow	Crit assembly		Operational	0.01	1983-08-23			
SK Physical	Moscow	Crit assembly		Operational	0.60	2000-04-18			
Efir-2M	Moscow	Crit assembly		Operational	0.10	1973-01-01			
Delta	Moscow	Crit assembly		Operational	0.10	1985-04-24			
P	Moscow	Crit assembly		Operational	0.20	1987-07-17			
FM MR	Moscow	Crit assembly		Decommissioned	0.10	1971-01-01			
Grog	Moscow	Crit assembly		Permanent shutdown	0.10	1981-01-01			
B-1000	Moscow	Crit assembly		Operational	0.20	1986-09-03			
Kvant	Moscow	Crit assembly		Operational	1.00	1990-01-01			
Astra	Moscow	Crit assembly		Operational	0.10	1981-08-05			
SF-7	Moscow	Crit assembly		Decommissioned	0.10	1975-03-12			
SF-3	Moscow	Crit assembly		Decommissioned	0.10	1979-01-01			
SF-5	Moscow	Crit assembly		Decommissioned	0.10	1972-01-01			
SF-1	Moscow	Crit assembly		Decommissioned	0.10	1972-05-19			
Mayak	Moscow	Crit assembly		Decommissioned	0.01	1967-01-01			
RBMK	Moscow	Crit assembly		Operational	0.03	1982-01-06			
UG	Moscow	Crit assembly		Permanent shutdown	0.10	1965-12-18			
MATR-2	Obninsk	Crit assembly		Under decommissioning	0.40	1963-08-02			
FS-1M	Obninsk	Crit assembly		Decommissioned	0.20	1970-03-03			
MAKET	Moscow	Crit assembly		Operational	0.10	1976-12-30			
Argus-2	Moscow	Homog (L)		Decommissioned	50				
U-3	Saint Petersburg	Pool		Operational	50	1964-12-13			
Arbus (AST-1)	Dimitrovgrad	Tank		Decommissioned	12,000	1963-01-01			
VK-50	Dimitrovgrad	Bwr-prototype		Operational	200,000	1964-12-15			
Gamma	Moscow	Tank		Under decommissioning	150	1981-12-30			
FBR-L fast burst-laser	Chelyabinsk	Fast burst		Operational	5	1981-03-31			
YAGUAR (NHUAR)	Chelyabinsk	Homog pul		Operational	4	1988-12-31			
IGRIK, pulsed homog	Chelyabinsk	Homog		Operational	30	1975-03-15			
BARS-5 (FNRS)	Snezhinsk	Fast burst		Operational	10	1986-01-01			
RG-1M	Norilsk	Pool		Decommissioned	100	1970-04-15			
BOR-60	Dimitrovgrad	Fast breeder		Operational	60,000	1968-12-30			
F-1	Moscow	Graphite pile		Permanent shutdown	24	1946-12-25			
RBT-6	Dimitrovgrad	Pool		Operational	6,000	1975-09-24			
RBT-10/2	Dimitrovgrad	Pool		Operational	7,000	1983-11-24			
IRT-T	Tomsk	Pool, irt		Operational	6,000	1967-07-22			
Romashka	Moscow	Space test		Decommissioned	40	1964-08-01			
MR	Moscow	Tank		Under decommissioning	50,000	1963-12-01			
SBR-2	Obninsk	Fast, Hg cooled		Decommissioned	150	1957-03-01			
RPT	Moscow	Graphite		Decommissioned	20,000	1952-04-01			
OR-M	Moscow	Tank wwr		Operational	300	1988-05-20			
TVR	Moscow	Tank		Under decommissioning	2,500	1949-01-01			
VVR-2	Moscow	Tank		Decommissioned	3,000	1954-01-01			
VIR-2M	Sarov	Homog pul		Operational	25	1980-04-24			
VIR-2	Sarov	Homog pul		Decommissioned	25	1965-01-01			
BR-5	Obninsk	Fast, Na cooled		Decommissioned	5,000	1958-01-01			
BR-2	Obninsk	Fast		Decommissioned	100	1956-01-01			
MIR.M1	Dimitrovgrad	Pool/channels		Operational	100,000	1966-12-24			
IR-8	Moscow	Pool, irt		Operational	8,000	1981-08-12			
UVPSh	Moscow	Subcrit		Operational	0.00	1964-03-18			
UG Subcritical	Moscow	Subcrit		Operational	0.00	1955-04-20			
UV	Moscow	Subcrit		Operational	0.00	1980-12-04			
RBT-10/1	Dimitrovgrad	Pool		Decommissioned	10,000	1983-12-01			
UG Rig	Elektrostal	Crit graphite		Decommissioned	0.03	1967-04-20			
VVER	Moscow	Subcrit		Extended shutdown	0.00	1974-04-06			
UV-1	Moscow	Subcrit		Extended shutdown	0.00	1983-10-25			
UV-2	Moscow	Subcrit		Extended shutdown	0.00	1972-11-04			
Aksamit	Moscow	Crit assembly		Operational	0.00	2002-02-25			
R-1	Saint Petersburg	Subcrit		Permanent shutdown	0.00	1991-08-19			
SO-2M	Moscow	Subcrit		Permanent shutdown	0.00	1975-01-01			
7KVD	Podolsk	Subcrit		Permanent shutdown	0.00	1979-12-07			

== Saudi Arabia ==
Name	Location	Type	Purpose	Status	Thermal power [kW]	Operation date	Closure date	Owner and operator	Notes
LPRR	Riyadh	Pool		Under construction	30				

== Serbia ==
Name	Location	Type	Purpose	Status	Thermal power [kW]	Operation date	Closure date	Owner and operator	Notes
RB	Belgrade	Heavy water		Temporary shutdown	0.00	1958-04-29		Vinča Nuclear Institute, Vinča	At the beginning, the RB reactor was designed and constructed as an unreflected zero power heavy water - natural uranium critical assembly. First criticality was reached in April 1958. Later, the 2% enriched metal uranium fuel and 80% enriched UO_{2} fuel were obtained and used in the reactor core. Modifications of the reactor control, safety and dosimetry systems (1960, 1976, 1988) converted the RB critical assembly to a flexible heavy water reflected experimental reactor with 1 W nominal power, operable up to 50 W. Several coupled fast-thermal systems were designed and constructed at RB reactor in the early 1990s, for research in fast reactors physics.
RA	Vinča	Heavy water		Decommissioned	6,500	1959-12-28	2002	Vinča Nuclear Institute, Vinča	6.5 MW heavy water moderated and cooled research reactor

== Slovenia ==
Name	Location	Type	Purpose	Status	Thermal power [kW]	Operation date	Closure date	Owner and operator	Notes
TRIGA- MARK II LJUBLJANA	Ljubljana	TRIGA Mark II		Operational	250	1966-05-31		Jožef Stefan Institute	(web page link)

== South Africa ==
Name	Location	Type	Purpose	Status	Thermal power [kW]	Operation date	Closure date	Owner and operator	Notes
SAFARI-1	Pretoria	Tank in pool		Operational	20,000	1965-03-18		South African Nuclear Energy Corporation (NECSA)	Pelindaba Nuclear Research Center near Pretoria 25°48′03″S 27°56′54″E
Pelinduna-0	Pretoria	Crit fast		Decommissioned	0.00	1967-01-01			Pelindaba Nuclear Research Center near Pretoria 25°48′03″S 27°56′54″E

== South Korea ==
Nuclear research reactors in South Korea
Name	Location	Type	Purpose	Status	Thermal power [kW]	Operation date	Closure date	Owner and operator	Notes
KRR-1	Seoul	TRIGA Mark II		Decommissioned	250	1962-03-19		KAERI	Research Reactor,100 kW, built 1962 (decommissioned)
KRR-2	Seoul	TRIGA Mark III		Decommissioned	2,000	1972-04-10		KAERI	Research reactor, 2MW, built 1972 (decommissioned)
AGN-201K	Yongin	Homog (S)		Operational	0.01	1982-12-04		Kyung Hee University	Aerojet General Nucleonics Model 201 research reactor, 0.01 kW commissioned 1982
HANARO	Daejeon	Pool		Operational	30,000	1995-02-08		KAERI	MAPLE class reactor
KJRR	Busan	Pool		Planned	15,000			KAERI	

== Spain ==
Name	Location	Type	Purpose	Status	Thermal power [kW]	Operation date	Closure date	Owner and operator	Notes
CORAL-I	Madrid	Crit assembly		Decommissioned	0.05	1968-03-28			
ARBI Reactor	Bilbao	Argonaut		Decommissioned	10	1962-06-26			
Argos Research Reactor	Barcelona	Argonaut		Decommissioned	1.00	1961-06-01	1992	Polytechnic University of Catalonia	Argos
JEN-1 Mod	Madrid	Pool		Decommissioned	3,000	1958-10-09			

== Sweden ==
Nuclear research reactors in Sweden
Name	Location	Type	Purpose	Status	Thermal power [kW]	Operation date	Closure date	Owner and operator	Notes
R1	Stockholm	Pool	Research	Decommissioned	600	1954-07-13	1970	KTH	
R-2	Nyköping	Tank	Research, production of isotopes for industry	Under decommissioning	50,000	1960-05-04	2005	Studsvik	
R2-0	Nyköping	Pool	Research, production of isotopes for industry	Under decommissioning	1,000	1960-06-20	Never completed	Studsvik	
Ågestaverket (R-3)	Farsta, Stockholm	Pool	District heating	Under decommissioning	80,000	1963	1973	Vattenfall AB, Barsebäck Kraft AB	
R-4	Marviken, Norrköping		Research, plutonium production						Never completed, abandoned in 1970
FR-0	Nyköping	Crit fast	Research	Decommissioned	0.01	1964-02-01	1971	Studsvik	Zero-power fast reactor
KRITZ	Nyköping	Crit assembly		Decommissioned	0.10	1969-10-01		Studsvik	

== Switzerland ==
Name	Location	Type	Purpose	Status	Thermal power [kW]	Operation date	Closure date	Owner and operator	Notes
AGN 211 P	Basel	Homog (S)		Decommissioned	2	1959-08-01			
CROCUS	Lausanne	Crit assembly		Operational	0.10	1983-07-13		École polytechnique fédérale de Lausanne	Null-power light water reactor. In operation.
PROTEUS	Villigen	Crit assembly		Under decommissioning	1.00	1968-01-01	2012	Paul Scherrer Institut	Null-power reconfigurable reactor (graphite moderator/reflector).
DIORIT	Zürich	Heavy water		Under decommissioning	30,000	1960-10-10	1977	Paul Scherrer Institut	
AGN-201P	Geneva	Homog (S)		Decommissioned	0.00	1958-06-01	2020	University of Basel	Research reactor, in operation since 1958 (demonstrated at the Expo 58 in Brussels), since 1959 at the University of Basel. Decommissioned in 2020.
SAPHIR	Würenlingen	Pool		Decommissioned	10,000	1957-04-30	1993	Paul Scherrer Institut	
Lucens	Lucens, Vaud	Heavy-water moderated, carbon dioxide gas-cooled.	Pilot nuclear power plant	Decommissioned	30,000	10 May 1968	3 March 1969	Nationale Gesellschaft zur Förderung der industriellen Atomtechnik; Energie Ouest Suisse	Prototype power reactor (GCHWR) 30 MWh/6 MWe. Shut down in 1969 after accident. Site decommissioned.

== Syria ==
Name	Location	Type	Purpose	Status	Thermal power [kW]	Operation date	Closure date	Owner and operator	Notes
SRR-1	Damascus	MNSR		Operational	30	1996-03-04			

== Taiwan ==
Name	Location	Type	Purpose	Status	Thermal power [kW]	Operation date	Closure date	Owner and operator	Notes
THAR	Hsinchu	Argonaut		Decommissioned	10	1974-04-20			
THOR	Hsinchu	Triga conv		Operational	2,000	1961-04-13			
THMER	Hsinchu	Mobile Edu.		Decommissioned	0.00	1975-11-19			
TRR	Taoyuan	Heavy water		Decommissioned	40,000	1973-01-03			
WBRL	Taoyuan	Homog (L)		Decommissioned	100	1983-02-23			
ZPRL	Taoyuan City	Pool		Permanent shutdown	30	1971-02-02			

== Tajikistan ==
Name	Location	Type	Purpose	Status	Thermal power [kW]	Operation date	Closure date	Owner and operator	Notes
Argus-FTI	Dushanbe	Homog (L)		Under construction	50				

== Thailand ==
Name	Location	Type	Purpose	Status	Thermal power [kW]	Operation date	Closure date	Owner and operator	Notes
TRR-1/M1	Bangkok	TRIGA Mark III		Operational	1,300	1977-11-07		Thailand Institute of Nuclear Technology (TINT)	Thai Research Reactor 1/Modification 1, Installed 1962, modified 1975–77.
SUT MNSR	Nakorn Ratchasima	MNSR		Planned	45				Ongkharak Nuclear Research Center (under construction)

== Turkey ==
Name	Location	Type	Purpose	Status	Thermal power [kW]	Operation date	Closure date	Owner and operator	Notes
TR-1	Istanbul	Pool		Decommissioned	1,000	1962-01-01		Turkish Atomic Energy Authority	ÇNAEM
TR-2, Turkish Reactor 2	Istanbul	Pool		Extended shutdown	5,000	1981-12-10		Turkish Atomic Energy Authority	ÇNAEM
ITU-TRR	Istanbul	TRIGA Mark II		Operational	250	1979-03-11		Istanbul Technical University	Institute of Energy

=== Fuel pilot plants ===
- TRD Fuel Pilot Plant (Turkish Atomic Energy Authority)

== Ukraine ==
Name	Location	Type	Purpose	Status	Thermal power [kW]	Operation date	Closure date	Owner and operator	Notes
KIPT Experimental Neutron Source	Kharkiv	Subcrit		Under construction	0.19				
WWR-M Kyiv	Kyiv	Tank wwr		Operational	10,000	1960-12-02		Kyiv Institute for Nuclear Research	
Multipurpose RR	Kyiv	Pool		Planned	20,000			Kyiv Institute for Nuclear Research	
SNI, IR-100	Sevastopol	Pool, irt		Operational	200	1967-04-18		Sevastopol Institute of Nuclear Energy and Industry	
SPh IR-100	Sevastopol	Crit assembly		Operational	0.00	1974-07-17		Sevastopol Institute of Nuclear Energy and Industry	

== United Kingdom ==
- Culham - JET fusion reactor
- Dounreay
  - The Shore Test Facility (STF) at VULCAN (Rolls-Royce Naval Marine)
  - DSMP1 at VULCAN (Rolls-Royce Naval Marine) (shut down 1984)
  - Prototype Fast Reactor (shut down 1994)

Name	Location	Type	Purpose	Status	Thermal power [kW]	Operation date	Closure date	Owner and operator	Notes
ZEUS	Didcot	Crit fast		Decommissioned	0.10	1955-12-22			
ZEPHYR	Didcot	Crit fast		Decommissioned	0.00	1954-02-01			
Dounreay Zero Energy ZETR	Thurso	Crit assembly		Decommissioned	0.00	1957-08-13			
ERIC	Aldermaston	Crit fast		Decommissioned	0.00	1952-01-01			
Waterfall	Aldermaston	Crit fast		Decommissioned	0.00	1954-01-01			
Atlas	Aldermaston	Crit assembly		Decommissioned	0.00	1952-01-01			
VIPER	Aldermaston	Fast burst		Permanent shutdown	0.50	1967-05-26		Atomic Weapons Establishment	
BERKELEY Zero Energy	Berkeley	Graphite		Decommissioned	1.00	1966-04-14			
BEPO	Didcot	Graphite, air		Under decommissioning	6,500	1962-01-01	1968		
LIDO	Didcot	Pool		Decommissioned	300	1956-09-01	1974		
HAZEL	Didcot	Homog (L)		Decommissioned	0.00	1957-01-01			
DAPHNE	Didcot	Heavy water		Decommissioned	0.10	1962-01-01			
ZENITH II	Winfrith, Dorchester	Graphite		Decommissioned	1.00	1972-03-01			
ZENITH I	Winfrith, Dorchester	Graphite CO_{2}		Decommissioned	0.50	1959-12-01			
JUNO	Winfrith, Dorchester	Crit assembly		Decommissioned	0.10	1964-03-01			
HERO	Seascale	Graphite AGR		Decommissioned	3	1962-06-01			
Windscale AGR (WAGR)	Seascale	Graphite AGR		Decommissioned	120,000	1962-08-09	1982		
Dragon	Winfrith, Dorchester	He cooled		Under decommissioning	20,000	1964-01-01			
Dounreay MTR	Thurso	Heavy water		Decommissioned	22,500	1958-05-01	1969		
MERLIN	Aldermaston	Pool		Decommissioned	5,000	1959-07-01			
HORACE	Aldermaston	Crit assembly		Decommissioned	0.01	1958-05-01			
DIMPLE	Winfrith, Dorchester	Pool		Decommissioned	0.10	1962-01-01			
ICI TRIGA Reactor	Billingham	TRIGA Mark I		Decommissioned	250	1971-08-01	1988	ICI Physics and Radioisotopes Dept of ICI R&D (later to become Tracerco)	
Universities Research Reactor	Risley, Warrington	Argonaut		Decommissioned	300	1964-07-07	1991		Shut down 1991, decommissioned, land released 1996
CONSORT reactor Imperial College	London	Pool		Decommissioned	100	1965-09-04	2012	Imperial College, Silwood Park campus	Began operation in 1965, shut down in 2012, fuel removed in 2014. Fully decommissioned by 2022.
UTR-300	East Kilbride, Glasgow	Argonaut		Decommissioned	300	1963-06-01	1995		Scottish Universities Research and Reactor Centre (100 kW Argonaut class reactor deactivated 1995, fully dismantled 2003)
VERA Nuclear Assembly	Aldermaston	Crit fast		Decommissioned	0.10	1961-01-01			
VULCAN	Thurso	Pwr		Permanent shutdown	0.00	1961-01-01			
Neptune	Raynesway, Derby	Pool		Operational	0.30	1963-01-03		Rolls-Royce Marine Power Operations Ltd	
HECTOR	Winfrith, Dorchester	Zero power htd		Decommissioned	0.10	1963-03-01			
HERALD	Aldermaston	Pool		Decommissioned	5,000	1960-10-10			
NESTOR	Didcot	Argonaut		Decommissioned	30	1961-01-01			
ZEBRA	Winfrith, Dorchester	Crit fast		Decommissioned	1.00	1962-12-01			
JASON	Greenwich, London	Argonaut		Decommissioned	10	1959-09-30	1999		
Dounreay Fast Reactor	Thurso	Fast breeder reactor		Under decommissioning	65,000	1959-11-01	1977		
PLUTO	Harwell	Heavy water		Under decommissioning	26,000	1957-10-25	1990	Harwell AERE	
DIDO	Harwell	Heavy water		Under decommissioning	26,000	1956-11-07	1990	Harwell AERE	
GLEEP	Harwell	Graphite		Decommissioned	50	1947-08-18	1990	Harwell AERE	
Toad	Thurso	Crit assembly		Decommissioned	0.01	1960-07-01			
Panther	Thurso	Crit assembly		Decommissioned	0.01	1961-01-01			
Puma	Thurso	Crit assembly		Decommissioned	0.00	1960-11-01			
Phoenix	Thurso	Crit assembly		Decommissioned	0.10	1960-07-01			
Sirius	Thurso	Crit assembly		Decommissioned	0.10	1961-05-01			
Tessie	Thurso	Crit assembly		Decommissioned	5	1959-11-01			
QMC Subcritical Assembly	Stratford Marsh, London	Subcrit		Decommissioned	0.00	1959-03-01		Queen Mary College	
QMC UTR-B	Stratford Marsh, London	Argonaut		Decommissioned	100	1968-06-10	1982	Queen Mary College	
HECTOR	NA	Graphite CO_{2}		Decommissioned	0.10	1963-03-10			
PILE 1	Sellafield						1957		Sellafield was previously named Windscale until 1971. Shut down 1957 after Windscale fire.
PILE 2	Sellafield						1957		Sellafield was previously named Windscale until 1971.

== United States ==
Plutonium production reactors
Name	Location	Reactor type	Purpose	Status	Capacity (MWth)	Construction start date	Operation date	Closure	Operator and owner
B-Reactor	Hanford Site	Graphite pile	Production of plutonium-239 for weapons	Preserved as a museum					Manhattan Project
F-Reactor	Hanford Site	Graphite pile	Production of plutonium-239 for weapons	Shut down and cocooned					Manhattan Project
D-Reactor	Hanford Site	Graphite pile	Production of plutonium-239 for weapons	Shut down and cocooned					Manhattan Project
H-Reactor	Hanford Site	Graphite pile	Production of plutonium-239 for weapons	Shut down and cocooned					United States Atomic Energy Commission
DR-Reactor	Hanford Site	Graphite pile	Production of plutonium-239 for weapons	Shut down and cocooned					United States Atomic Energy Commission
C-Reactor	Hanford Site	Graphite pile	Production of plutonium-239 for weapons	Shut down and cocooned					United States Atomic Energy Commission
KE-Reactor (K-East)	Hanford Site	Graphite pile	Production of plutonium-239 for weapons	Shut down and being cocooned					United States Atomic Energy Commission
KW-Reactor (K-West)	Hanford Site	Graphite pile	Production of plutonium-239 for weapons	Shut down and being cocooned					United States Atomic Energy Commission
N-Reactor	Hanford Site	Graphite pile	Production of plutonium-239 for weapons and electricity for regional grid	Shut down and cocooned					United States Atomic Energy Commission
R-Reactor	Savannah River Site	Heavy water	Production of plutonium-239 and tritium for weapons	Surveillance and maintenance mode	2260			1964	United States Atomic Energy Commission
P-Reactor	Savannah River Site	Heavy water	Production of plutonium-239 and tritium for weapons	Surveillance and maintenance mode	2680			1988	United States Atomic Energy Commission
L-Reactor	Savannah River Site	Heavy water	Production of plutonium-239 and tritium for weapons	Surveillance and maintenance mode	2700			1988	United States Atomic Energy Commission
K-Reactor	Savannah River Site	Heavy water	Production of plutonium-239 and tritium for weapons	Surveillance and maintenance mode	2710			1988	United States Atomic Energy Commission
C-Reactor	Savannah River Site	Heavy water	Production of plutonium-239 and tritium for weapons	Surveillance and maintenance mode	2915			1985	United States Atomic Energy Commission

=== Army Nuclear Power Program ===
Army Nuclear Power Program reactors
Name	Location	Reactor type	Purpose	Status	Capacity (kW)	Construction start date	Operation date	Closure	Operator and owner
SM-1	Fort Belvoir	PWR	Training and testing	Decommissioned	2000		8 April 1957 to 16 March 1973		United States Army
SM-1A	Fort Greely		Electricity and heat supply	Decommissioned	2000		13 March 1962 to 1972		United States Army
PM-2A	Camp Century, Greenland		Electricity and steam supply	Decommissioned	2000		3 October 1960		United States Army
PM-1	Sundance Air Force Station	PWR	Electricity and steam supply	Decommissioned	1250		25 February 1962 to 1968		United States Air Force
PM-3A	McMurdo Station, Antarctica		Electricity, seawater desalinization, and heat supply	Decommissioned	1750		3 March 1962 to September 1972		United States Navy
MH-1A	Panama Canal Zone		Electricity and fresh water supply	Decommissioned	10000		24 January 1967		United States Army
SL-1	Idaho National Laboratory	BWR	Stationary power supply demonstration	Decommissioned. Destroyed by explosion January 3, 1961.	400 thermal, 200 electric		11 August 1958 to 3 January 1961		United States Army
ML-1	Idaho National Laboratory	Gas turbine	Mobile power supply demonstration	Decommissioned	140		30 March 1961		United States Army

=== United States Naval reactors ===
Naval Nuclear Power Program reactors
Name	Location	Reactor type	Purpose	Status	Capacity (kW)	Construction start date	Operation date	Closure	Operator and owner
S8G	Knolls Atomic Power Laboratory		Training	Operational					United States Navy
MARF/S7G	Knolls Atomic Power Laboratory		Training	Operational					United States Navy
D1G	Knolls Atomic Power Laboratory		Prototype	Decommissioned					United States Navy
S3G	Knolls Atomic Power Laboratory		Prototype	Decommissioned					United States Navy
ex-USS Daniel Webster (SSBN-626)	Joint Base Charleston		S5W reactor moored training ship (MTS-626)	Operational					United States Navy
ex-USS Sam Rayburn (SSBN-635)	Joint Base Charleston		S5W reactor moored training ship (MTS-635)	Operational					United States Navy
ex-USS La Jolla (SSN-701)	Joint Base Charleston		S6G reactor moored training ship (MTS-701)	Operational					United States Navy
S1C	Windsor, Connecticut		Training	Decommissioned					United States Navy

=== Research reactors ===
United States Federal Government non-plutonium production research reactors
Name	Location	Reactor type	Purpose	Status	Capacity (kW)	Construction start date	Operation date	Closure	Operator and owner
SEFOR (Southwest Experimental Fast Oxide Reactor)	Cove Creek Township, Arkansas		Research, development, and experiments	Decommissioned					
SL-1	INL		Stationary power supply demonstration	Decommissioned; destroyed by accidental explosion	400 thermal 200 electric		1958	1961	United States Army
AFSR	INL		Research, development, and experiments	Decommissioned			1959	Late 1970s	
ARMF-I	INL		Research, development, and experiments	Decommissioned			1960	1974	
ARMF-II	INL		Research, development, and experiments	Decommissioned			1962	1968	
Advanced Test Reactor (ATR)	INL		Research, development, and experiments	Operational			1967		
Advanced Test Reactor Critical (ATRC)	INL		Research, development, and experiments	Operational			1964		
A1W-A	INL		Research, development, and experiments	Decommissioned			1958	1994	
A1W-B	INL		Research, development, and experiments	Decommissioned			1959	1987	
BORAX-I	INL		Research, development, and experiments	Decommissioned; intentionally exploded			1953	1954	
BORAX-II	INL		Research, development, and experiments	Decommissioned			1954	1955	
BORAX-III	INL		Research, development, and experiments	Decommissioned			1955	1956	
BORAX-IV	INL		Research, development, and experiments	Decommissioned			1956	1958	
BORAX-V	INL		Research, development, and experiments	Decommissioned			1962	1964	
CET (Critical Experiment Tank)	INL		Research, development, and experiments	Decommissioned			1958	1962	
CFRMF (Coupled Fast Reactivity Measurement Facility)	INL		Research, development, and experiments	Decommissioned			1968	1991	
CP-1	University of Chicago		Research, development, and experiments	Decommissioned			1942	1943	University of Chicago
CP-2	Site A		Research, development, and experiments	Decommissioned	10		1943	1954	University of Chicago
CP-3	Site A		Research, development, and experiments	Decommissioned	300		1944	1954	University of Chicago
CP-5	Site A		Research, development, and experiments	Decommissioned	5,000			1979	Argonne National Laboratory
CRCE (Cavity Reactor Critical Experiment)	INL		Research, development, and experiments	Decommissioned			1967	Early 1970s	
Experimental Breeder Reactor I (originally CP-4)	INL		Research, development, and experiments	Museum			1951	1963	
Experimental Breeder Reactor II	INL		Research, development, and experiments	Decommissioned			1961	1994	
Experimental Boiling Water Reactor	INL		Research, development, and experiments	Decommissioned					
Experimental Test Reactor	INL		Research, development, and experiments	Decommissioned					
EBOR (Experimental Beryllium Oxide Reactor)	INL		Research, development, and experiments	Never operated					
EOCR (Experimental Organic Cooled Reactor)	INL		Research, development, and experiments	Never operated					
ETRC (Engineering Test Reactor Critical Facility)	INL		Research, development, and experiments	Decommissioned			1957	1982	
FRAN (Nuclear Effects Reactor)	INL		Research, development, and experiments	Decommissioned			1968	1970	
Gas Cooled Reactor Experiment	INL		Research, development, and experiments	Decommissioned			1960	1961	United States Army
Heat Transfer Reactor Experiment 1	INL		Research, development, and experiments	Decommissioned			1955	1956	
Heat Transfer Reactor Experiment 2	INL		Research, development, and experiments	Decommissioned			1957	1961	
Heat Transfer Reactor Experiment 3	INL		Research, development, and experiments	Decommissioned			1958	1960	
HOTCE (Hot Critical Experiment)	INL		Research, development, and experiments	Decommissioned			1958	1961	
Integral Fast Reactor (IFR)	INL		Research, development, and experiments	Never operated					
JANUS reactor	INL		Research, development, and experiments	Decommissioned				1992	
JUGGERNAUT	INL		Research, development, and experiments	Decommissioned					
Liquid Metal Fast Breeder Reactor (LMFBR)	INL		Research, development, and experiments	Decommissioned					
LOFT (Loss of Fluid Test Facility)	INL		Research, development, and experiments	Decommissioned			1973	1985	
ML-1	INL		Research, development, and experiments	Decommissioned			1961	1964	United States Army
MTR (Materials Testing Reactor)	INL		Research, development, and experiments	Decommissioned			1952	1970	
NRAD (Neutron Radiography Facility)	INL		Research, development, and experiments	Operational			1977		
OMRE	INL		Research, development, and experiments	Decommissioned	16,000		1957	1963	
PBF (Power Burst Facility)	INL		Research, development, and experiments	Decommissioned			1972	1985	
RMF (Reactivity Measurement Facility)	INL		Research, development, and experiments	Decommissioned			1954	1962	
SCRCE (Spherical Cavity Reactor Critical Experiment)	INL		Research, development, and experiments	Decommissioned			1967	1973	
SNAPTRAN-1	INL		Research, development, and experiments	Decommissioned			Early 1960s	Early 1960s	
SNAPTRAN-2	INL		Research, development, and experiments	Decommissioned			1964	1964	
SNAPTRAN-3	INL		Research, development, and experiments	Decommissioned			1965	1966	
SPERT-I	INL		Research, development, and experiments	Decommissioned			1955	1964	
SPERT-II	INL		Research, development, and experiments	Decommissioned			1960	1964	
SPERT-III	INL		Research, development, and experiments	Decommissioned			1958	1968	
SPERT-IV	INL		Research, development, and experiments	Decommissioned			1962	1970	
SUSIE (Shield Test Pool Facility)	INL		Research, development, and experiments	Decommissioned			1959	1962	
S1W/STR	INL		Research, development, and experiments	Decommissioned			1953	1989	
S5G	INL		Research, development, and experiments	Decommissioned			1965	1995	
ZPR-7	INL		Research, development, and experiments	Decommissioned					
THRITS (Thermal Reactor Idaho Test Station)	INL		Research, development, and experiments	Decommissioned			1964	1964	
TREAT (Transient Reactor Test Facility)	INL		Research, development, and experiments	Operational			1950; 2017	1994 present	
Zero Power Physics Reactor (ZPPR)(formerly Zero Power Plutonium Reactor)	INL		Research, development, and experiments	Decommissioned			1969	1990	
ZPR-III	INL		Research, development, and experiments	Decommissioned			1955	1970	
ZPR-6	INL		Research, development, and experiments	Decommissioned				1982	
ZPR-9	INL		Research, development, and experiments	Decommissioned				1981	
603-A	INL		Research, development, and experiments	Decommissioned					
710	INL		Research, development, and experiments	Decommissioned					
HBFR (High Flux Beam Reactor)	BNL		Research, development, and experiments	Decommissioned	100,000 (1966-1986); 85,000 (2007-present)		1965	1999	
Brookhaven Medical Research Reactor	BNL		Research, development, and experiments	Decommissioned				2000	
Brookhaven Graphite Research Reactor	BNL		Research, development, and experiments	Decommissioned				1968	
Fast Flux Test Facility	Hanford Site		Research, development, and experiments	Core Drilled					
UHTREX	LANL		Research, development, and experiments	Decommissioned					
Omega West	LANL		Research, development, and experiments	Decommissioned					
Clementine	LANL		Research, development, and experiments	Decommissioned					
BREN Tower	Nevada Test Site		Research, development, and experiments	Decommissioned					
Demonstration Using Flattop Fission (DUFF)	Nevada Test Site		Research, development, and experiments	Decommissioned			2012	2012	
X-10 Graphite Reactor	ORNL		Research, development, and experiments	Decommissioned			1943	1963	
Homogeneous Reactor Experiment (HRE)	ORNL		Research, development, and experiments	Decommissioned			1952	1954	
Homogeneous Reactor Test (HRT)	ORNL		Research, development, and experiments	Decommissioned			1957	1961	
Aircraft Reactor Experiment (ARE)	ORNL		Research, development, and experiments	Decommissioned			1954	1955	
Molten Salt Reactor Experiment (MSRE)	ORNL		Research, development, and experiments	Decommissioned			1965	1969	
Health Physics Research Reactor (HPRR)	ORNL		Research, development, and experiments	Decommissioned			1963	1987	
Low-Intensity Test Reactor (LITR)	ORNL		Research, development, and experiments	Decommissioned			1950	1968	
Bulk Shielding Reactor (BSR)	ORNL		Research, development, and experiments	Decommissioned			1950	1987	
Geneva Conference Reactor	ORNL		Research, development, and experiments	Decommissioned			1955	1955	
Tower Shielding Reactor-I (TSR-I)	ORNL		Research, development, and experiments	Decommissioned			1954	1958	
Tower Shielding Reactor-II (TSR-II)	ORNL		Research, development, and experiments	Decommissioned			1958	1982	
Oak Ridge Research Reactor (ORR)	ORNL		Research, development, and experiments	Decommissioned			1958	1987	
High Flux Isotope Reactor	ORNL		Research, development, and experiments	Operational			1965		
Pool Critical Assembly	ORNL		Research, development, and experiments	Decommissioned			1958	1987	
Experimental Gas Cooled Reactor (EGCR)	ORNL		Research, development, and experiments	Constructed but never operated; project cancelled in 1966					
HWCTR (Heavy Water Components Test Reactor)	Savannah River Site		Research, development, and experiments	Decommissioned					
Sodium Reactor Experiment	Santa Susana Field Laboratory		Research, development, and experiments	Decommissioned				1964	
SNAP-10A	Santa Susana Field Laboratory		Research, development, and experiments	Decommissioned; in low Earth orbit					
Annular Core Research Reactor	Sandia National Laboratories		Research, development, and experiments	Operational					
TRIGA Mark F	Bethesda, Maryland	Pool	Research, development, and experiments	Operational	1,000		1962		Armed Forces Radiobiology Research Institute
NIST reactor	Gaithersburg, Maryland	Tank type, heavy water moderated	Research, development, and experiments	Operational	20,000		1967		National Institute of Standards and Technology
TRIGA Mark I	Denver, Colorado	Pool	Research, development, and experiments	Operational	1,000		1969		U.S. Geological Survey
TRIGA Mark I	Omaha, Nebraska	Pool	Research, development, and experiments	Decommissioned; possession-only license			1959	2001	U.S. Veterans Administration
NASA reactors (2 reactors at site)	Sandusky, Ohio		Research, development, and experiments	Decommissioned; under decommission orders or license amendments					National Aeronautics and Space Administration
NS Savannah	James River Reserve Fleet, Virginia		Marine propulsion demonstration and goodwill visits	Decommissioned; possession-only license					Atomic Energy Commission, Maritime Administration (MARAD), and Department of Commerce

==== Civilian (private and university) research and test reactors licensed to operate ====
Operator	Location	Reactor	Power (MW)	Years operational
Aerotest Operations Inc.	San Ramon, California	TRIGA Mark I	0.25	1965 -
Brigham Young University	Provo, Utah	Atomics International L77	0.00001	1967-1992
Colorado State University	Fort Collins, CO	AGN-201 #109	0.0000001	1957 - 1976
Dow Chemical Company	Midland, Michigan	TRIGA Mark I	0.3	1967 -
General Electric Company	Sunol, California	Nuclear Test	0.1	1957 -
Idaho State University	Pocatello, Idaho	AGN-201 #103	0.000005	1967 -
Iowa State University	Ames, Iowa	Experimental, instructional	0.003	1959-1998
Kansas State University	Manhattan, Kansas	TRIGA Mark II	1.25	1962 -
Kodak	Rochester, New York	Californium Neutron Flux Multiplier	5.8	1975 - 2006
Massachusetts Institute of Technology	Cambridge, Massachusetts	Tank Type HWR Reflected (MITR-II)	6	1958 -
Missouri University of Science and Technology	Rolla, Missouri	Pool (MSTR)	0.2	1961 -
North Carolina State University	Raleigh, North Carolina	Pulstar	1	(earlier reactors dating to 1953) 1973 -
Ohio State University	Columbus, Ohio	Pool (modified Lockheed)	0.5	1961 -
Oregon State University	Corvallis, Oregon	TRIGA Mark II (OSTR)	1.1	1967 -
Penn State University	University Park, Pennsylvania	TRIGA BNR reactor	1.1	1955 -
Purdue University	West Lafayette, Indiana	Lockheed (PUR-1)	0.001	1962 -
Reed College	Portland, Oregon	TRIGA Mark I (RRR)	0.25	1968 -
Rensselaer Polytechnic Institute	Schenectady, New York	Reactor critical facility	0.000015	1965-
Rhode Island Atomic Energy Commission/ University of Rhode Island	Narragansett, Rhode Island	GE pool	2	1964 -
Texas A&M University	College Station, TX	AGN-201M #106 - TRIGA Mark I (two reactors)	1.000005 (2 reactors)	1957 - , 1962 -
University of Arizona	Tucson, AZ	TRIGA Mark I	0.11	1958–2010
University of California-Davis	Sacramento, California	TRIGA Mark II, McClellan Nuclear Radiation Center	2.3	1998 -
University of California, Irvine	Irvine, California	TRIGA Mark I	0.25	1969 -
University of Florida	Gainesville, Florida	Argonaut (UFTR)	0.1	1959 -
University of Maryland, College Park	College Park, Maryland	TRIGA Mark I	0.25	1960 -
University of Massachusetts Lowell	Lowell, Massachusetts	Pool (UMLRR)	1	1975 -
University of Missouri	Columbia, Missouri	General Electric tank type MURR	10 (expanding to 30 with NextGen MURR)	1966 -
University of New Mexico	Albuquerque, New Mexico	AGN-201M #112	0.000005	1966 -
University of Texas at Austin	Austin, Texas	TRIGA Mark II	1.1	1992 -
University of Utah	Salt Lake City, Utah	TRIGA Mark I	0.1	1975 -
University of Wisconsin–Madison	Madison, Wisconsin	TRIGA Mark I	1	1961 -
Valar Atomics	Orangeville, Utah	Ward250 - High Temperature Gas Cooled Reactor	0.1 (0.25)	2026 -
Washington State University	Pullman, Washington	TRIGA conversion (WSUR)	1	1961 -

==== Civilian (private and university) research and test reactors formerly licensed to operate ====
Research and test reactors under decommission orders or license amendments are authorized to decontaminate and dismantle their facility to prepare for final survey and license termination. Research and test reactors with possession-only licenses are not authorized to operate the reactor, only to possess the nuclear material on-hand. They are permanently shut down.

Operator	Location	Reactor	Power	Status
General Atomics (2 reactors at site)	San Diego, California			Under decommission order(s) or license amendment(s)
Georgia Institute of Technology	Atlanta, GA	Georgia Tech Research Reactor: heavy water moderated and cooled	5 MW	Shut down and defueled due to safety concerns related to nearby 1996 Summer Olympics events. Decommissioning announcement July 1, 1997, reactor building remnants removed as of 2015.
University of Illinois at Urbana–Champaign	Urbana, Illinois			Under decommission order(s) or license amendment(s)
University of Michigan	Ann Arbor, Michigan			Under decommission order(s) or license amendment(s)
General Electric Company (3 reactors at site; two research and test reactors and one power reactor)	Sunol, California			Possession-only license(s)
University at Buffalo	Buffalo, New York			Retired in 1994. Possession-only license(s).
Worcester Polytechnic Institute	Worcester, Massachusetts			Possession-only license(s)
Westinghouse	Waltz Mill Site; Madison, PA	TR-2; also known as the Westinghouse Test Reactor or Westinghouse Testing Reactor (WTR)		Decommissioned

==== Civilian (private and university) research and test reactors in construction ====
Executive Order 14301 created DOE's Reactor Pilot Program, expediting advanced reactor testing outside national labs, targeting criticality for three test reactors by July 4, 2026. 11 Reactors are being developed as part of this program. This list is of the reactors already in construction.

Operator	Location	Reactor	Power	Status
Aalo Atomics Inc.	Idaho National Laboratory,Idaho Falls, Idaho	Aalo-X	-	Zero Power Critical
Antares Nuclear Inc.	Idaho National Laboratory,Idaho Falls, Idaho	R1 Mark-0 Test reactor	-	Zero power critical
Oklo Inc. / Atomic Alchemy	Lockhart, Texas	Groves	-	Zero power critical
Oklo Inc.	-	Pluto	-	-
Oklo Inc.	Idaho National Laboratory,Idaho Falls, Idaho	Aurora	75 MWe	Construction Started
Radiant Industries Inc.	DOME (Demonstration of Microreactor Experiments) facility, Idaho National Laboratory,Idaho Falls, Idaho	Kaleidos microreactor	3 MWt / 1 MWe	Construction Started
Valar Atomics Inc.	Orangeville, Utah	Ward250	100kW	Power Operations

== Uruguay ==
Name	Location	Type	Purpose	Status	Thermal power [kW]	Operation date	Closure date	Owner and operator	Notes
RU-1	Montevideo	Pool		Decommissioned	10	1978-04-20			URR reactor - A small pool-type research reactor placed in Centro de Investigaciones Nucleares (CIN). In operation since the early 1970s up until 1997 when it was dismantled and returned to United States due to a 1997 law against use of nuclear energy in Uruguay.

== Uzbekistan ==
Name	Location	Type	Purpose	Status	Thermal power [kW]	Operation date	Closure date	Owner and operator	Notes
IIN-3M	Tashkent	Homog pul		Decommissioned	20	1975-12-01			
WWR-SM Tashkent	Tashkent	Tank wwr		Operational	10,000	1959-09-10			

== Venezuela ==
Name	Location	Type	Purpose	Status	Thermal power [kW]	Operation date	Closure date	Owner and operator	Notes
RV-1	San Antonio de los Altos	Pool		Permanent shutdown	3,000	1960-07-12	1994	Venezuelan Institute for Scientific Research (IVIC)	

== Vietnam ==
Name	Location	Type	Purpose	Status	Thermal power [kW]	Operation date	Closure date	Owner and operator	Notes
Dalat Research Reactor	Da Lat	Pool TRIGA Mark II		Operational	500	1963-02-26			(supplied by USA 1963, shut down 1975, reactivated by USSR 1984)
Multipurpose Research Reactor	Da Lat	Pool, irt		Planned	15,000				

== See also ==
- Integrated Nuclear Fuel Cycle Information System
- List of commercial nuclear reactors
- List of nuclear power stations
- List of small modular reactor designs
- Lists of nuclear disasters and radioactive incidents
- Nuclear power by country

== Notes and references ==
=== External links ===
- DoE list
- ICJT list—includes the defunct
