= Argonne Fast Source Reactor =

Argonne Fast Source Reactor (AFSR) was a research reactor which was located at the Argonne National Laboratory, a United States Department of Energy national laboratory, facility located in the high desert of southeastern Idaho between Idaho Falls, Idaho and Arco, Idaho.

== History ==
The Argonne Fast Source Reactor was a tool used to calibrate instruments and to study fast reactor physics, augmenting the Zero Power Plutonium Reactor (ZPPR) research program. Located at Argonne-West, this low-power reactor—designed to operate at a power of only one kilowatt—contributed to an improvement in the techniques and instruments used to measure experimental data.

The AFSR was designed to supplement the existing facilities of the Idaho Division of Argonne National Laboratory. It was designed as a readily available source of both fast and thermal neutrons for use as follows:

- developing, testing, calibrating, and standardizing various counters;
- preparation of radioactive metallic foils used in the development of counting and radiochemical techniques;
- checking out complex experimental systems before operation in other reactors;
- and development of potential experiments in the fast reactor field.

In the fall of 1970, this reactor was moved to a new location adjacent to the ZPPR facility at the ANL West site of the NRTS.

The reactor started up on October 29, 1959, and operated through the late 1970s.

== Design ==
AFSR was designed and built in 1958 near EBR-I on the National Reactor Testing Station (NRTS). AFSR had a design power of one kilowatt.

== Decommissioning ==
AFSR operated through the late 1970s. The reactor is now shutdown and defueled.

== Bibliography ==
- Stacy, Susan M. "Proving the Principle". Idaho Operations Office of the Department of Energy. Idaho Falls, Idaho. DOE/ID-10799. 2000. Retrieved from: https://factsheets.inl.gov/SitePages/Publications.aspx
- This article incorporates text from the public domain (prepared by or on behalf of the US government) work "Proving the Principle" (2000) which may be found at: https://factsheets.inl.gov/SitePages/Publications.aspx.

== See also ==
- Argonne National Laboratory
- Idaho National Laboratory
- List of nuclear research reactors#United States
