= Sosny =

Sosny (Belarusian: Сосны; Russian: Сосны), literally meaning "Pine trees" in several Slavic languages, may refer to the following places:

- Sosny 2, an agrotown in Lyuban District, Minsk Region
- Sosny, Kamuna Selsoviet, Lyuban District, an agrotown in Lyuban District, Minsk Region
- Sosny, Kamyenyets District, a village in Kamyenyets District, Brest Region
- Sosny, Minsk, part of Minsk, Belarus, formerly a settlement to cater nuclear research facilities
- Sosny, Myadzyel District, a village in Myadzyel District, Minsk Region
- Sosny, Poland, a village
- Sosny, Moscow Oblast, a village in Russia
- Sosny Residence, Soviet/Russian governmental residence in Siberia
