= Saint-Paul-lès-Durance =

Commune in Provence-Alpes-Côte d'Azur, France

- Commune
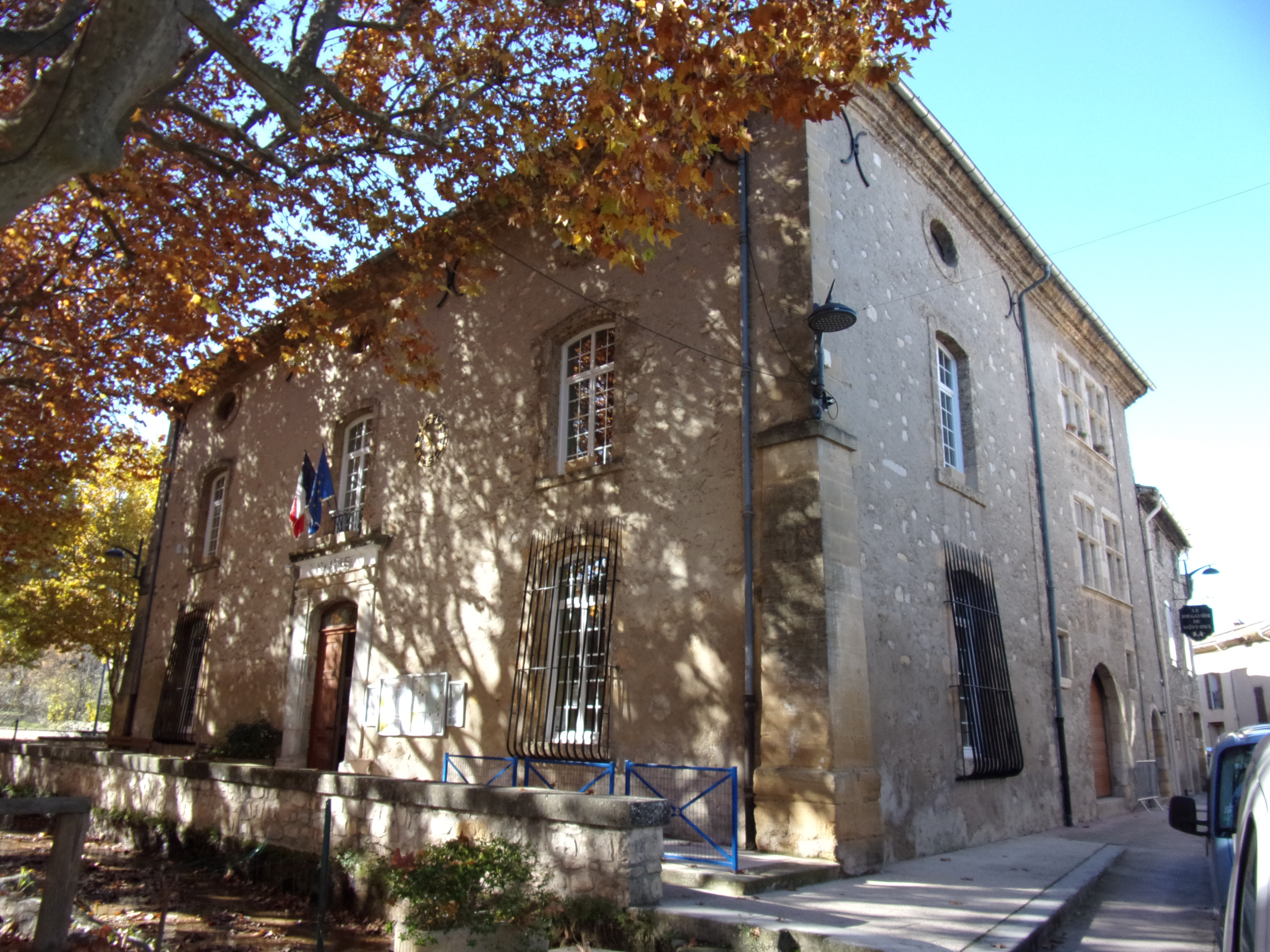
- The town hall

- Coat of arms
- Location of Saint-Paul-lès-Durance
- Location within France Location within Provence-Alpes-Côte d'Azur
- Coordinates: 43°41′16″N 5°42′30″E
- Country: France
- Region: Provence-Alpes-Côte d'Azur
- Department: Bouches-du-Rhône
- Arrondissement: Aix-en-Provence
- Canton: Trets
- Intercommunality: Aix-Marseille-Provence

Government
  - Mayor (2026–32): Romain Buchaut
- Area^{1}: 45.81 km^{2} (17.69 sq mi)
- Elevation: 254 m (833 ft)
- Highest elevation: 519 m (1,703 ft)
- Lowest elevation: 230 m (750 ft)
- Population (2023): 885
  - Density: 19.3/km^{2} (50.0/sq mi)
- Time zone: UTC+01:00 (CET)
  - Summer (DST): UTC+02:00 (CEST)
- INSEE/Postal code: 13099 /13115
- ^{1} French Land Register data, which excludes lakes, ponds, glaciers > 1 km^{2} (0.386 sq mi or 247 acres) and river estuaries.

Saint-Paul-lès-Durance (French pronunciation: [sɛ̃ pɔl lɛ dyʁɑ̃s], literally Saint-Paul near Durance; also spelled Saint-Paul-lez-Durance; Provençal: Sant Pau de Durença) is a commune in the Bouches-du-Rhône department in Provence, southern France.

The Cadarache research center for nuclear energy is located in Saint-Paul-lès-Durance and next to it the international nuclear fusion research and engineering megaproject ITER one of the most expensive buildings ever built and the largest scientific research collaboration in history.

The town was established in the 10th century and has around 1,000 inhabitants, a school, a church of the Roman Catholic Archdiocese of Aix, a 15th-century château, and a little shopping center.

== Population ==
Historical population
Year	Pop.	±% p.a.
1968	503	—
1975	463	−1.18%
1982	461	−0.06%
1990	643	+4.25%
1999	790	+2.31%
2007	964	+2.52%
2012	987	+0.47%
2017	871	−2.47%
2023	885	+0.27%
Source: INSEE

== See also ==
- Communes of the Bouches-du-Rhône department
