= Texas A&M Nuclear Science Center =

Triga Mark I Reactor
- Operating institution: Texas A&M University
- Type: Pool
- Utilization: 90 MW·d/yr
- Power: 1 MW (thermal)

Construction and upkeep
- Construction cost: US$1.5 million
- Construction began: January 1, 1959
- First criticality: January 1, 1962
- Annual upkeep cost: US$0.9 million
- Staff: 20
- Operators: 11

Technical specifications
- Max thermal flux: 2.0×10^{13} n/(cm²·s)
- Max fast flux: 2.0×10^{11} n/(cm²·s)
- Fuel type: uranium zirconium hydride
- Cooling: 100% natural convection
- Neutron moderator: light water zirconium hydride
- Control rods: 6 rods, B_{4}C
- Cladding material: stainless steel

There are two nuclear research reactors that serve the Texas A&M University Nuclear Science Center. The older of the two is the AGN-201M model, a low-power teaching reactor. The newer reactor, the TRIGA Mark I, is focused strongly towards research.

== AGN-201M ==
This was the first reactor of the Nuclear Engineering program at Texas A&M, built in the 1950s and licensed on August 26, 1957. It is going through system upgrades and is not operational for 2017. The reactor is of a negligible thermal power of 5 watts but achieves criticality, making it a critical assembly.

The AGN-201M type reactor is also employed at University of New Mexico and another AGN-201 type is used at Idaho State University.

== TRIGA Mark I ==
This is the main reactor of the NSC, operation began in 1961. Tours are available to the public and it is reported that around 2,000 students participate in a tour each year. In 1999 there were 2,982 visitors.

The reactor is located in a stand-alone facility two and a half miles (4.0 km) away from the Texas A&M campus and close to an airfield.

=== Technical specifications ===
This reactor was part of the first line of TRIGA reactors but has a number of features that distinguishes it from the other dozens of TRIGA reactors in use today. It is a 1 megawatt pool-type reactor. It is designed for optimal irradiation of samples and is used to produce a number of radioisotopes for medical and industry applications.

The reactor ran on 70% highly enriched uranium (HEU) until early 2006 when the core was refueled with low enriched uranium as a part of the National Nuclear Security Administration's (NNSA) Global Threat Reduction Initiative. This was a part of the Bush administration's efforts to minimize the terrorist threat posed by nuclear fuel in civilian applications around the world and constituted the first and only refueling of the reactor ever. In the decades that it had been in operation, the fuel had depleted its U-235 content from 70% to around 60%. The new fuel is somewhere under 20% enriched since it is classified as LEU.
