= Sevastopol National University of Nuclear Energy and Industry =

University in Sevastopol, Crimea

- Севастопольский национальный университет ядерной энергии и промышленности
- Motto: Non verbis sed actis
- Established: 1915
- Affiliations: Sevastopol State University.
- Rector: Mykhailo Divizinuk
- Students: 2647
- Location: Sevastopol, Crimea; 44.6245°N 33.5690°E
- Website: Building details
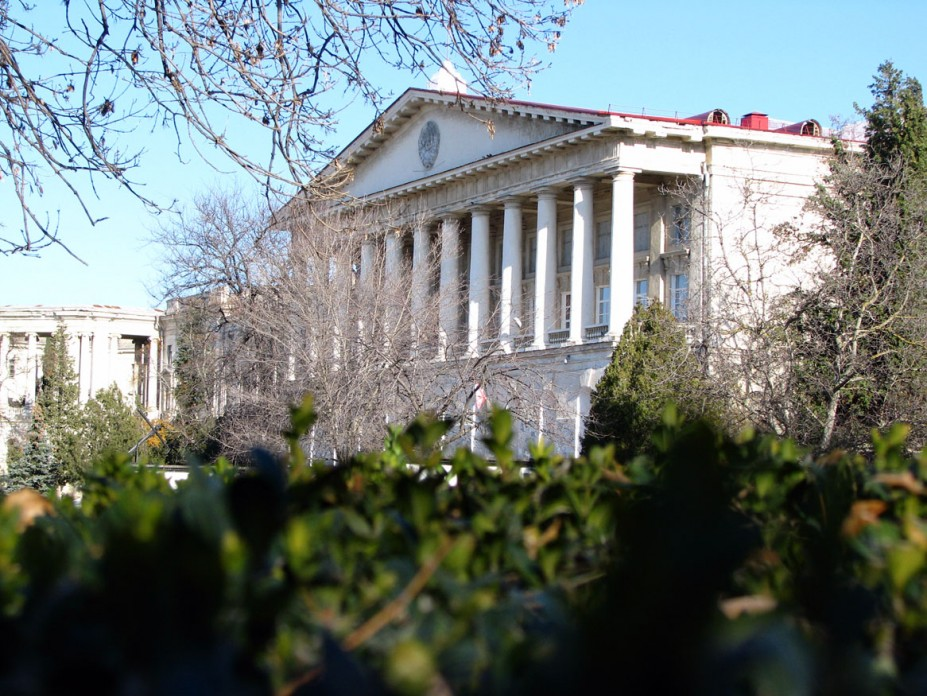

Sevastopol National University of Nuclear Energy and Industry is a university in Sevastopol, Crimea.

== History ==
The main study building was designed by architect A. Vensan in 1913. The foundation was laid in 1915, and the Second Marine Military School for Imperial Russian Navy officers training was situated there.

From 1924 till 1931, the building was the base of the Soviet Navy pilots college for the Soviet Union., That school later moved to Yeysk in the Russian Soviet Republic. In 1951 the Third Navy Engineering College was opened at the Sevastopol facility. Engineer-mechanics for submarine force were trained there starting from 1954.

In 1964 the college was renamed the Sevastopol Higher Navy Engineering College, with a mission to train specialists for nuclear submarines.

With Ukraine independence in 1991, the engineering departments of the Navy Institute of the Ukrainian Navy were situated there.

The faculty for Ukraine Nuclear Power Engineering specialist training was formed in 1996 on the base of Sevastopol Naval Institute NPP faculty (earlier Sevastopol Higher Naval Engineering College).

In 2002 the Institute received National status. In 2005 the Institute was reorganized as University – Sevastopol National University of Nuclear Energy and Industry.

After the Russian occupation of Crimea in 2014, the university was merged into Sevastopol State University.

== Campuses and buildings ==
At the disposal of students and teachers there is an educational and material base: scientific and technical library; modern multimedia audiences; more than 30 computer classes with hundreds of specialized training programs in all specialties, more than 40 specialized training laboratories equipped with everything necessary for teaching and research, as well as real equipment of nuclear power plants, radioactive sources, etc.

Research and training reactor IP-100, (with laboratories for the production of neutron activation analysis based on the nuclear spectrometric complex produced by Canberra-Packard; a set of equipment for monitoring the doping of silicon and spectrophotometer); analytical simulator of NPP power unit control with WWER-1000 reactor, a set of local training simulators of NPP shops

The university has

- a sport complex, a gym, sports grounds;
- a library with a collection of over 415 000 books and a reading hall for 450 seats;
- a hostel, a cafeteria, an assembly hall for 500 seats, a canteen for 2 000 seats;
- a medical unit is available.

The university has IV Level of Accreditation and it enables the university to train specialists, including foreign citizens, on bachelor's, specialist's and master's degree programmes.

== Institutes and faculties ==
- Institute of Nuclear power Engineering
- Institute of Electrical Power Engineering and Energy Saving
- Institute of Nuclear Chemical Technologies
- Institute of Environmental Safety and Information Security
- Institute of Nanotechnologies, Information Measuring and Specialized Computer Systems in Power Industry

== Awards and reputation ==
Rating of Ukrainian universities of III, IV levels of accreditation Top-200 Ukraine in 2012 № 96 (16,59449284)
