= Reactor Institute Delft =

Coordinates: 51.9905°N 4.3806°E

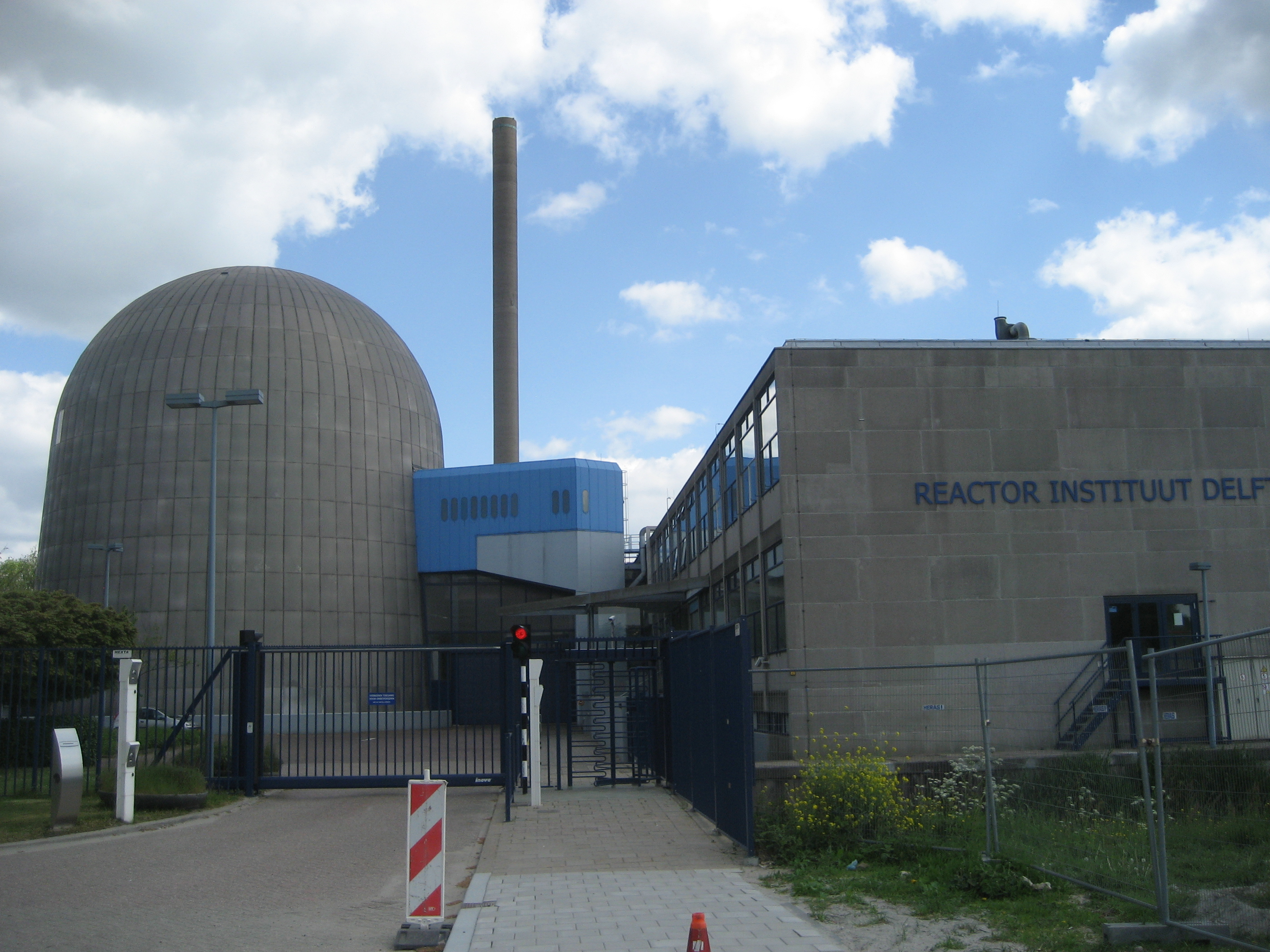
Reactor Institute Delft

The Reactor Institute Delft (Dutch: Reactor Instituut Delft), or RID, is a nuclear research institute at Delft University of Technology in Delft, Netherlands.

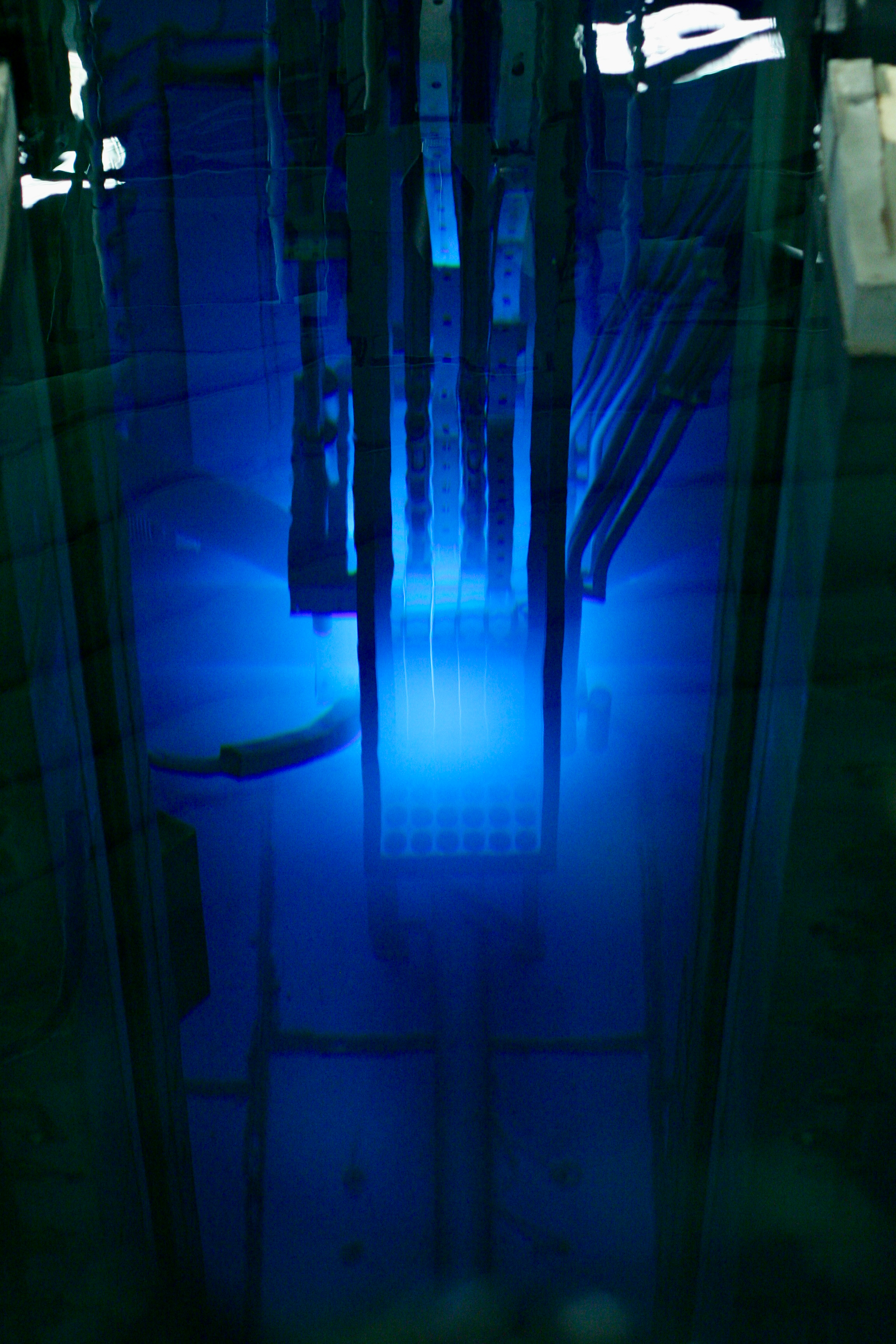
Core of the Hoger Onderwijs Reactor

The institute features the Hoger Onderwijs Reactor (HOR, Dutch: Higher Education Reactor), a 2 MW_{t} pool-type research reactor. Neutron research instruments are developed using several neutron beam lines leading from the core. One of the most intense positron beam lines in the world is powered by gamma-pair production near the reactor core.

== Organization ==
The institute is part of the Faculty of Applied Sciences since its name change to Reactor Institute. Previously, it was a separate part of the university and known as the Interfacultair Reactor Instituut (IRI, Dutch: Interfacultary Reactor Institute).
