= Heavy Water Components Test Reactor =

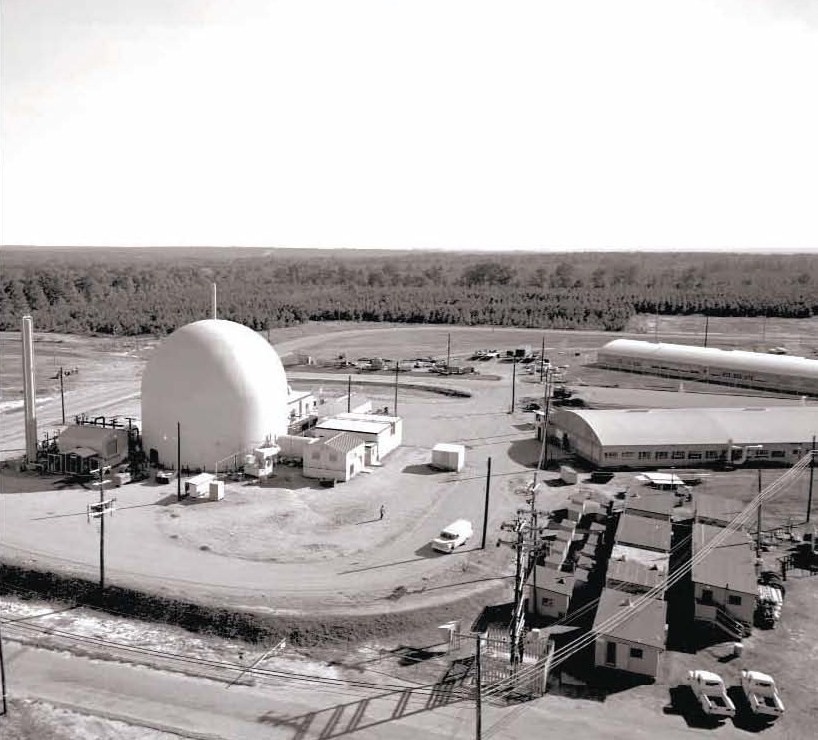
- Heavy Water Components Test Reactor
- Operating institution: Savannah River Site
- Location: Aiken, South Carolina
- Type: Heavy Water
- Power: 70 (thermal)

Construction and upkeep
- Construction began: 1958
- First criticality: 1962

Technical specifications
- Cooling: Heavy water
- Neutron moderator: Heavy water

Heavy Water Components Test Reactor (HWCTR) was an experimental nuclear reactor at the Savannah River Site in Aiken County, South Carolina. It was commonly called "Hector."

== History ==
It was constructed in 1958, starting in a temporary construction area, which is now called "B" Area. This is near the intersection of SRS roads "2" and "C." It is identified as Building 770-U. It has a cylindrical structure with a hemispherical dome. Its diameter is 70 ft (21.3 m) with a height of 125 ft (38.1 m). About 60 ft (18.3 m) is located underground. The building was designed to contain an internal pressure of 24 psig (165 kPa). It had a 70 MW thermal output.

It was built to test the concept of a heavy water moderated and cooled reactor for civilian power. It was tested from late 1962 to December 1964. It was not restarted. The fuel was removed and the facility was secured by 1971. All auxiliary buildings were removed. The reactor building awaits its final disposition.

During deactivation activities at the HWCTR in 2010, an unanticipated high dose was experienced during the removal of wire flux monitor cabling. On November 2, 2010, when work was in progress to remove the instrumentation, one of three small helium-filled ion chambers was removed from the instrumentation sleeve. A higher than expected dose rate was detected when the lowest of the three ion chambers exited the reactor vessel below the lower axial shield. As a result, three workers received whole body doses of 2.52 mREM, 2.7 mREM, and 5.6 mREM, which is equal to 1.5–3.3 average daily human exposures in the United States.
