= Zero Power Physics Reactor =

Coordinates: 43°35′35.2″N 112°39′16.8″W

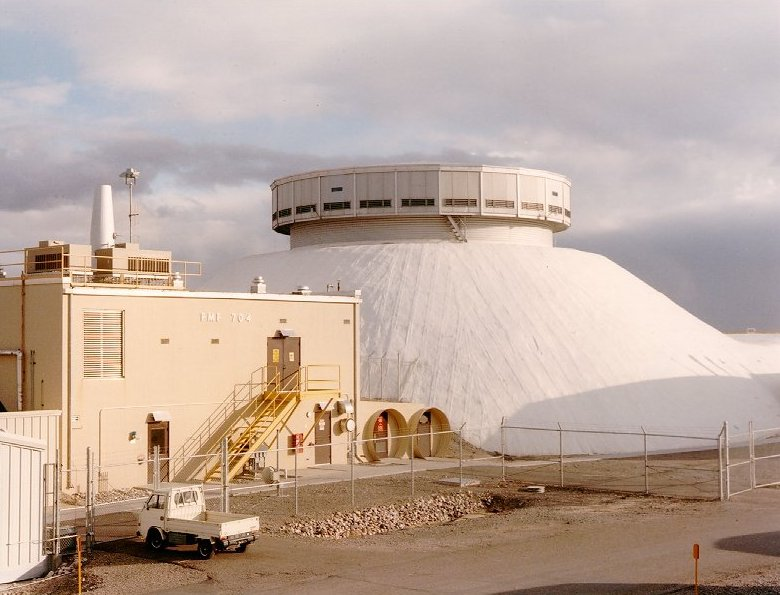
The Zero Power Physics Reactor.

The Zero Power Physics Reactor or ZPPR (originally named Zero Power Plutonium Reactor) was a split-table-type critical facility located at the Idaho National Laboratory, Idaho, USA. It was designed for the study of the physics of power breeder systems and was capable of simulating fast reactor core compositions characteristic of 300-500 MWe demonstration plants and 1000 MWe commercial plants.

ZPPR ran only at extremely low power, for testing nuclear reactor designs. ZPPR was operated as a critical facility from April 18, 1969 until 1990.

== Background ==
The United States Atomic Energy Commission was engaged in funding and directing research and development in nuclear breeder reactors as a potential long-term energy source. Building a low-power critical mockup of a nuclear core is a common practice in advance of building a full-sized nuclear power plant of any novel design, especially in lieu of uncertain nuclear data.

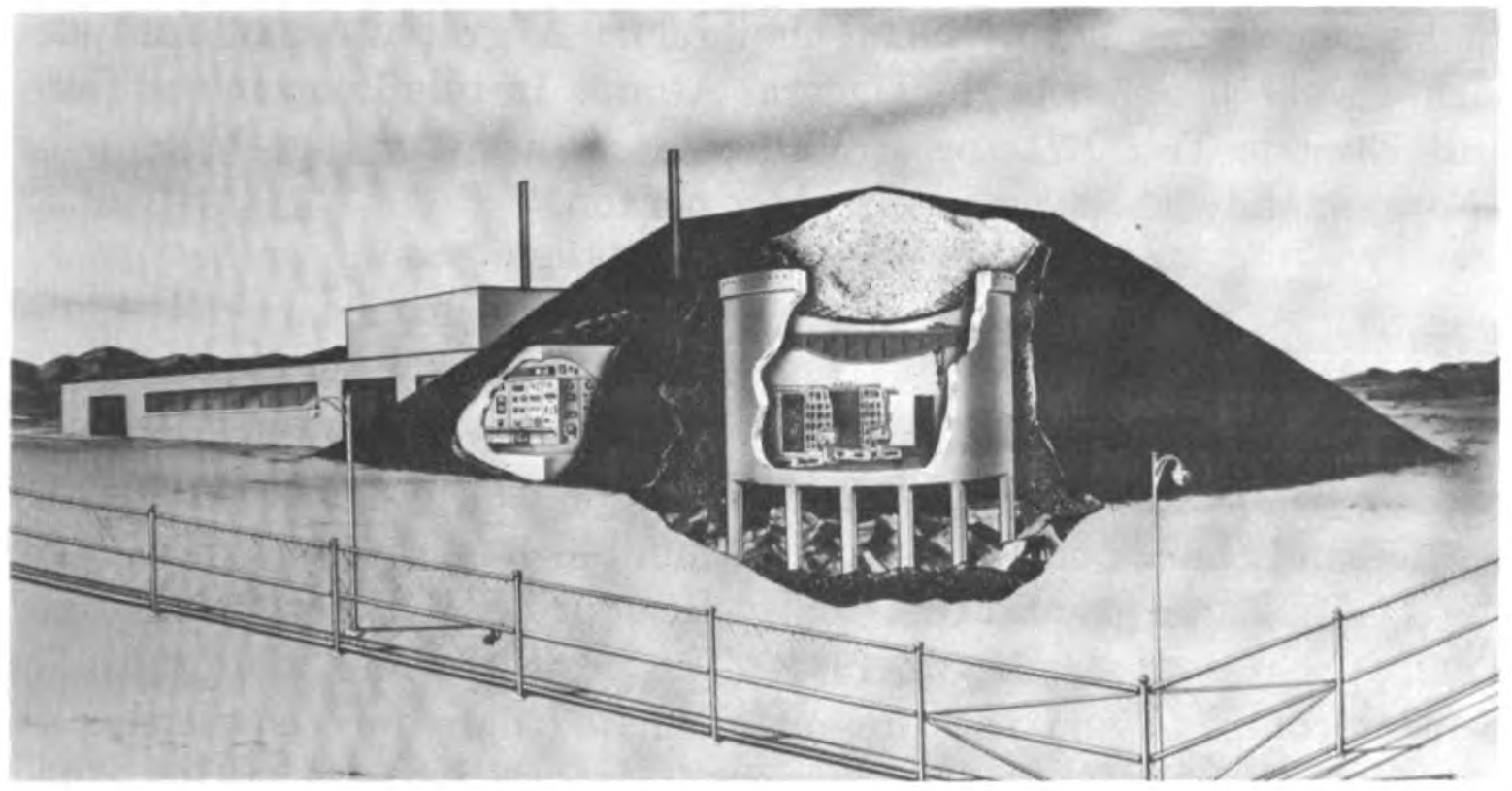
This shows ZPPR as conceived in 1964 AEC reports.

In 1964 development focus was shifting from small experimental reactors to large power-generating breeder reactors. The existing critical facilities (e.g. ZPR-3, ZPR-6, and ZPR-9) were too small and unprotected to handle the size of plutonium needed to simulate the core of a power breeder. Specifically, ZPR-3 could handle fast reactor plutonium experiments only up to a core volume of 600 liters, whereas ZPPR was designed to simulate systems with core volumes up to 5000 liters. A plutonium inventory of 3000 kg was planned.

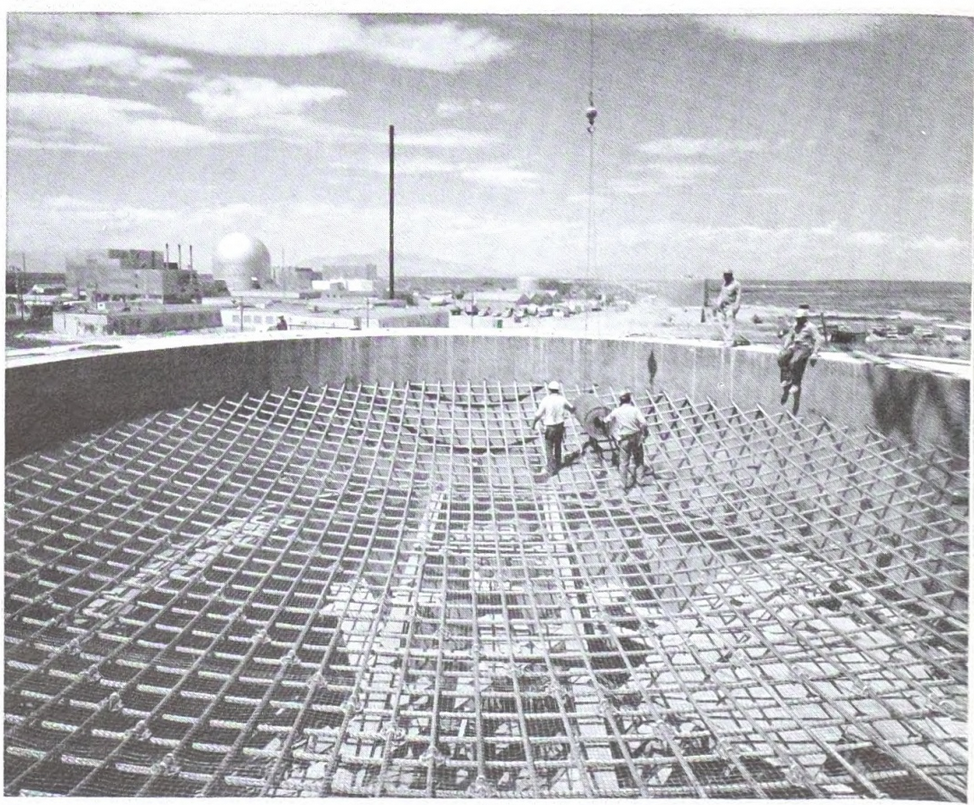
Taken in August, 1967, before the erection of the backup containment structure, this picture shows the network of 80 cables that support the sand and gravel roof over the ZPPR reactor cell

== Design and construction ==
The design basis accident (DBA) calculated to illustrate the capability of the containment structure included a reactivity insertion rate of 20 cents/second with complete failure of all safety devices. In this unlikely scenario, 40 kg of plutonium would have vaporized, and the sodium would have boiled and combusted with air. The associated toxicity concerns of this DBA necessitated the inclusion of the cell's gravel-sand roof and HEPA filters in the backup containment structure.

In November, 1964 a $3 million contract was awarded to Mason & Hanger-Silas Mason Co to begin construction of the facility starting in late 1965.

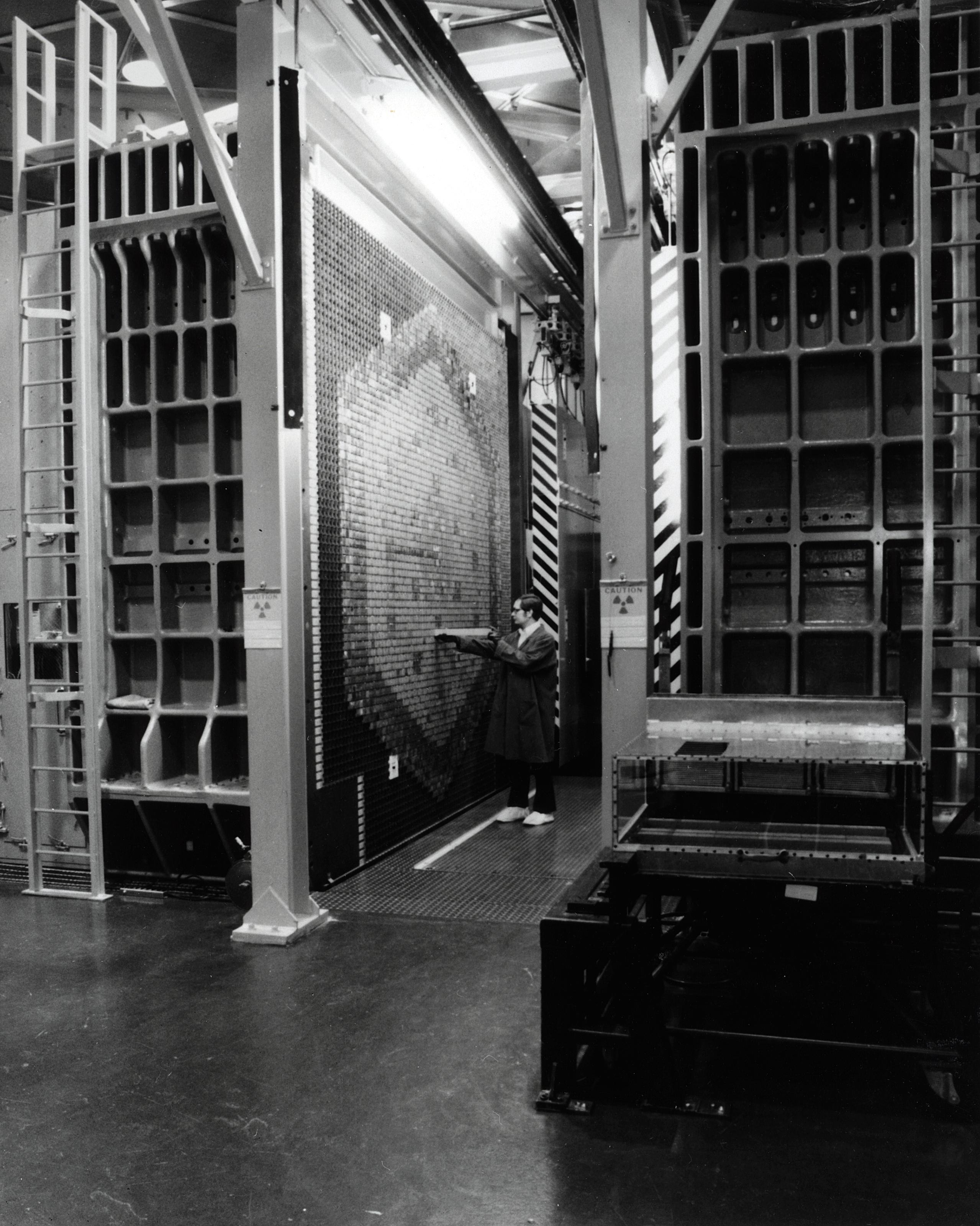
Nuclear engineer inserting fuel into the ZPPR. (HD.6B.163)

== Operation and tests ==
Twenty-one major experimental campaigns were performed in the ZPPR facility between March, 1969 and September, 1990. Each campaign was designated with a number, from ZPPR-1 to ZPPR-21, including sub-designations for individual loadings within each campaign. The various experiments supported the Fast Flux Test Facility, the Clinch River Breeder Reactor Project, and the Integral fast reactor programs, among others.

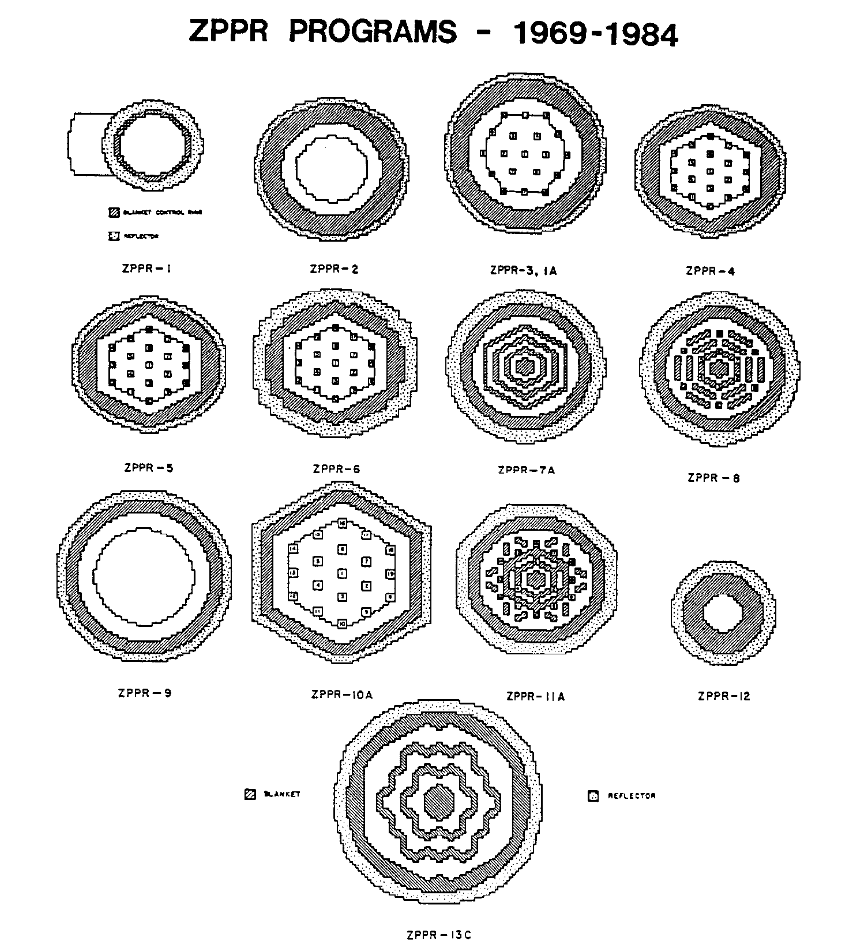
Core loadings used in the first 13 ZPPR campaigns

== Legacy and Current Use ==
The data collected at ZPPR has been used regularly by nuclear reactor designers as a means to validate computer simulations. For example, in 2020 the Versatile Test Reactor program used ZPPR-15 to validate nuclear core calculations.

In 2020, the National Reactor Innovation Center began developing two reactor demonstration test beds at Idaho National Laboratory, including one in the ZPPR cell, now known as the ZPPR Test bed (ZTB).
