= Slash =

Slash may refer to:

- Slash (musician)
- Slash (punctuation), the "/" character
- A swift, long cutting stroke; a mark made by such a stroke; or something resembling such a mark

== Arts and entertainment ==
=== Fictional characters ===
- Slash (Marvel Comics)
- Slash (Teenage Mutant Ninja Turtles)

=== Music ===
- Harry Slash & The Slashtones, an American rock band
- Nash the Slash, stage name of Canadian musician James Plewman (1948–2014)
- Slash (musician), stage name of British-American guitarist Saul Hudson (born 1965)
  - Slash (album), debut solo album by Slash
  - Slash (autobiography), a book written by Slash with Anthony Bozza
- "Slash" (song), a 2024 song by South Korean band Stray Kids
- Slash Records, an American punk record label

=== Other ===
- Slash (fanzine), a punk rock fanzine founded in 1977
- Slash (film), a 2016 American comedy
- Slash fiction, a genre of fan fiction

== People ==
- Kordell Stewart, retired National Football League quarterback
- Wolfie D, professional wrestler with the ring name Slash

== Sports ==
- Slash, produce a slash line in baseball
- Slash, a type of basketball play frequently executed by a slasher
- Slash, the act of slashing (ice hockey)

== Other uses ==
- Samsung Slash, a cell phone
- Slash (logging), woody debris generated by timber harvesting
- Slash (software), content management software used by website Slashdot
- Slash Church, Ashland, Virginia, on the National Register of Historic Places
- Slash pine, a tree native to the southeast United States
- Thomson, Georgia, a city in the U.S. originally named Slashes

== See also ==
- Slashdot, a social news website
- Slasher (disambiguation)
- Slashers (disambiguation)
- Slashing (disambiguation)
