= Small forward =

Basketball position

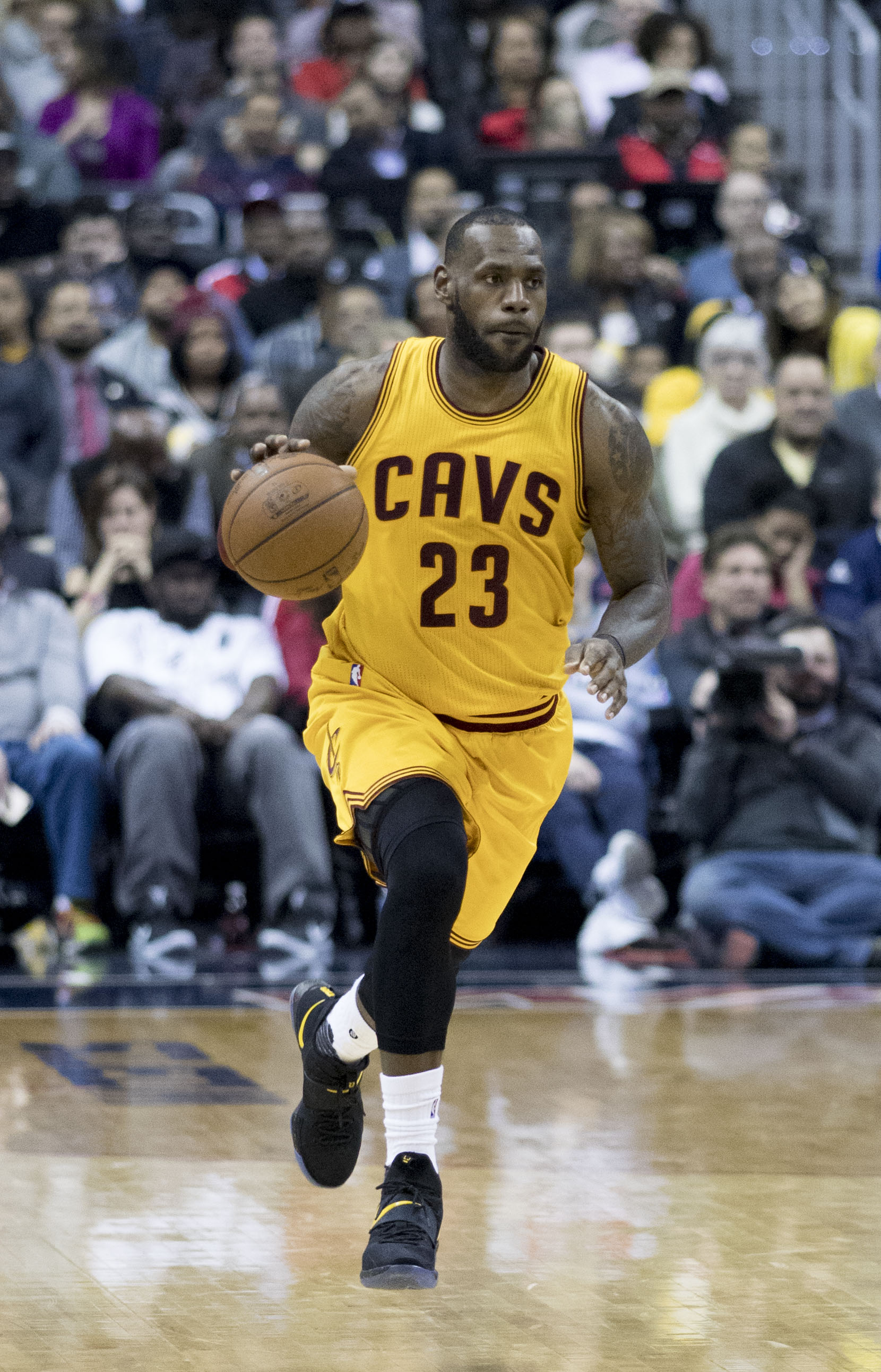
LeBron James is regarded as one of the greatest small forwards in the history of the NBA.

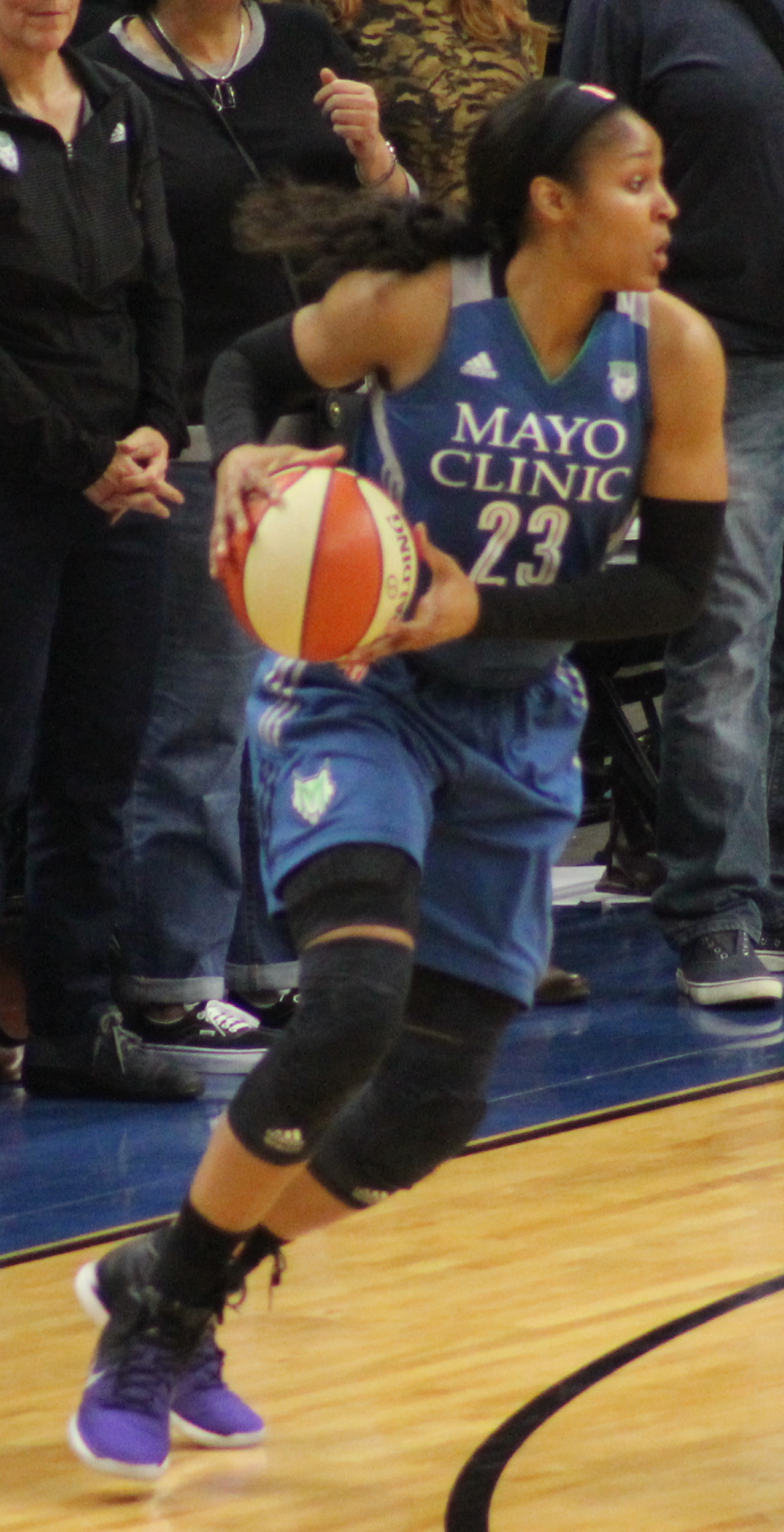
Maya Moore is regarded as one of the greatest small forwards in the history of the WNBA.

The small forward (SF), also known as the three, is one of the five positions in a regulation basketball game. Small forwards are typically shorter, quicker, and leaner than power forwards and centers but taller, larger, and stronger than either of the guard positions. They are strategic and are often relied upon to score, defend, create open lanes, and rebound for their team.

The small forward is considered to be perhaps the most versatile of the five main basketball positions as they contribute offensively and defensively. In the NBA, small forwards typically range from 6' 6" (1.98 m) to 6' 9" (2.06 m); in the WNBA, they are usually between 6' 0" (1.83 m) to 6' 2" (1.88 m). This puts them at the average height of all professional basketball players because they are taller than the guards, but shorter than the power forward and center.

Small forwards are responsible for scoring points and defending, and often are secondary or tertiary rebounders behind the power forward and center. In professional basketball, some have considerable passing responsibilities, and many are prolific scorers.

== Style of play ==
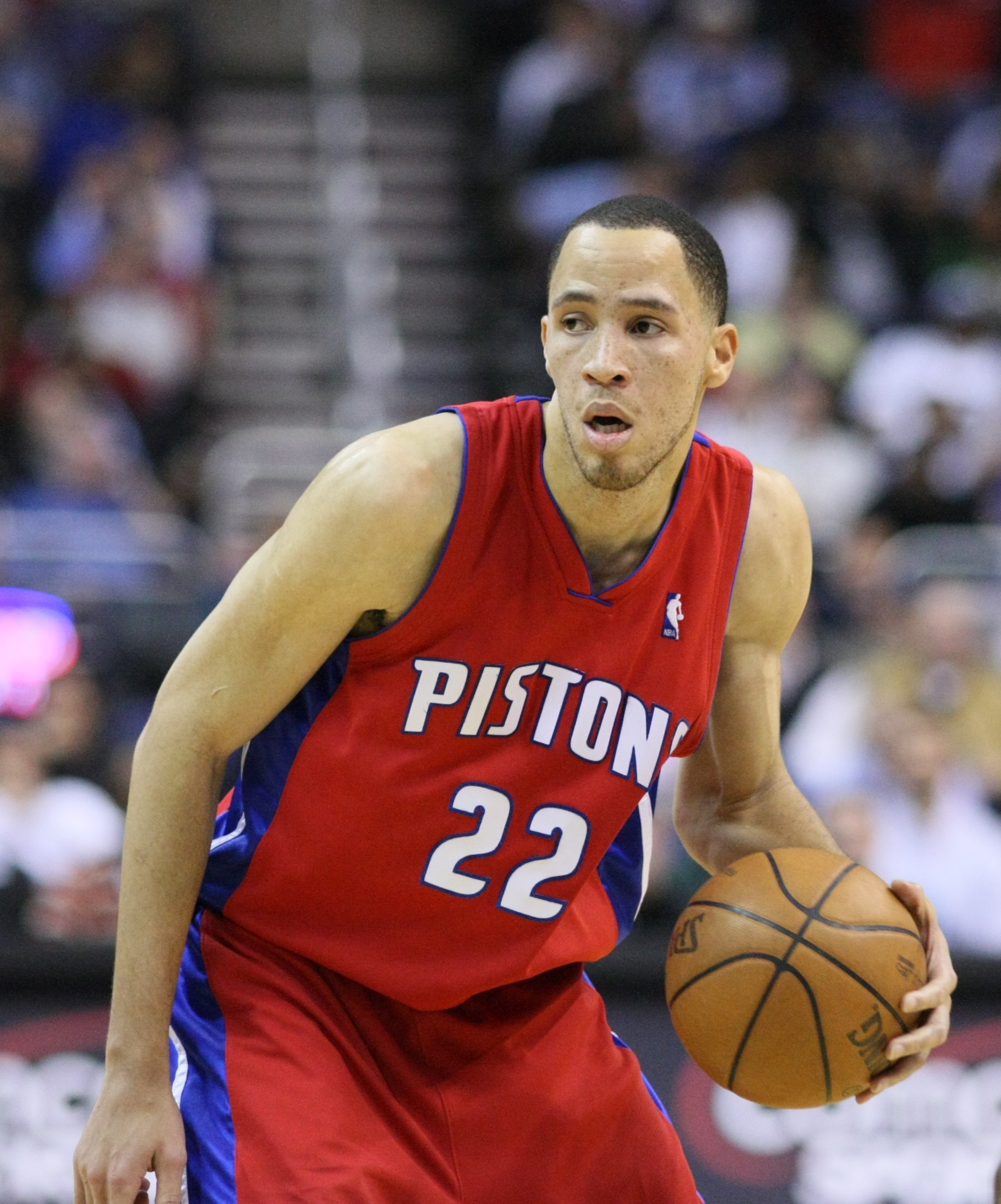
Former NBA small forward Tayshaun Prince, who became a crucial piece of the Detroit Pistons in the 2000s, was known for his ability to play both ends of the court.

The styles with which small forwards score vary widely. Some are very accurate shooters, such as Kevin Durant, and some prefer to initiate physical contact with opposing players, such as LeBron James. Other small forwards are often primarily slashers who also possess jump shots. In some cases, small forwards position on the baseline; in other cases, they operate as off-ball specialists. The defensive specialists among them are notably versatile, often being able to guard multiple positions using their size, speed, and strength. Having adequate footwork, and a solid defensive stance contributes to why small forwards are successful. When it comes to statistics, small forwards must be all over the map and at least have stats in most categories.

There are many small forwards that are well known for their contributions and versatility. Top small forwards in the history of the WNBA include: Maya Moore, Angel McCoughtry, Tamika Catchings, Elena Delle Donne, and DeWanna Bonner. Small forwards inducted in the Naismith Memorial Basketball Hall of Fame include Julius Erving, Larry Bird, James Worthy, Elgin Baylor, Paul Pierce, Vince Carter, John Havlicek, Scottie Pippen, Alex English, Bernard King, Chris Mullin, Dominique Wilkins, Rick Barry, Grant Hill, Tamika Catchings, Cheryl Miller, and Sheryl Swoopes.

== See also ==
- Cheryl Miller Award
