= 2026 Poland Darts Open =

2026 SUPERBET Poland Darts Open
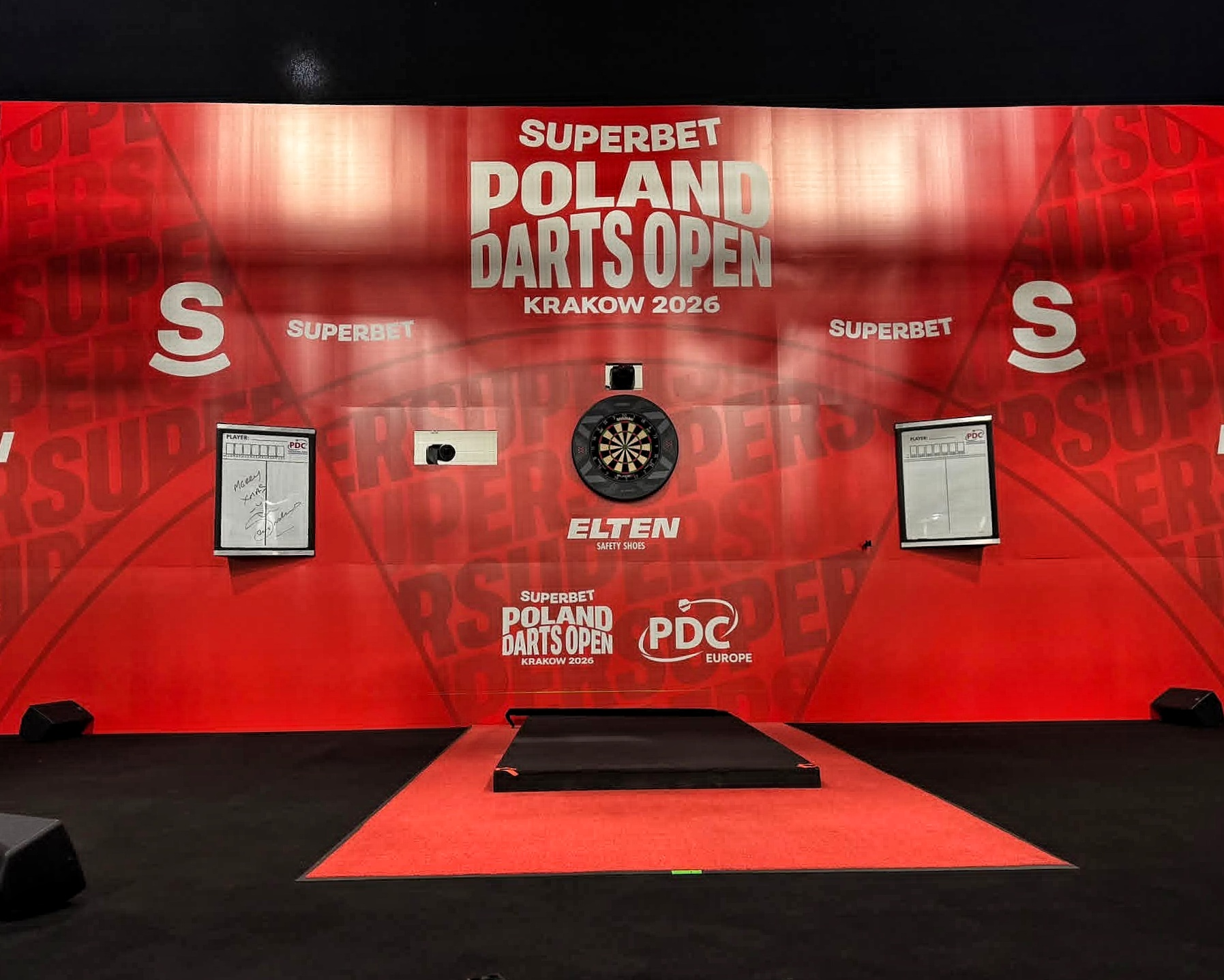

Tournament information
- Dates: 20–22 February 2026
- Venue: EXPO Kraków
- Location: Kraków, Poland
- Organisation(s): Professional Darts Corporation (PDC)
- Format: Legs
- Prize fund: £230,000
- Winner's share: £35,000
- Nine-dart finish: Gian van Veen
- High checkout: 170 Luke Humphries

Champion(s)
- Luke Littler (ENG)

The 2026 Poland Darts Open (known for sponsorship reasons as the 2026 SUPERBET Poland Darts Open) was a professional darts tournament that took place at the EXPO Kraków in Kraków, Poland, from 20 to 22 February 2026. It was the first of fifteen PDC European Tour events on the 2026 PDC Pro Tour, and was the first European Tour event to be held in Poland. It featured a field of 48 players and £230,000 in prize money, with £35,000 going to the winner.

Luke Littler and Gian van Veen contested the final, where Van Veen hit a nine-dart finish in the fourth leg. Littler won the tournament, his fifth European Tour title, by defeating Van Veen 8–4.

== Prize money ==
As part of a mass boost in prize money for Professional Darts Corporation (PDC) events in 2026, the prize fund for all 2026 European Tour events rose to £230,000, of which the winner will receive £35,000.

Stage (num. of players)		Prize money
Winner	(1)	£35,000
Runner-up	(1)	£15,000
Semi-finalists	(2)	£10,000
Quarter-finalists	(4)	£8,000
Third round losers	(8)	£5,000
Second round losers	(16)	£3,500*
First round losers	(16)	£2,000*
Total	£230,000	

- Pre-qualified players from the Orders of Merit who lose in their first match of the event shall not be credited with prize money on any Order of Merit.

== Qualification and format ==
The top 16 players on the two-year PDC Order of Merit will be seeded and will enter the tournament in the second round, while the next 16 highest-ranked players from the one-year PDC Pro Tour Order of Merit automatically qualified for the first round. The seedings were confirmed on 5 February. The remaining 16 places will go to players from four qualifying events – 10 from the Tour Card Holder Qualifier (held on 11 February), four from the Host Nation Qualifier (held on 19 February), one from the Nordic & Baltic Associate Member Qualifier (held on 6 February), and one from the East European Associate Member Qualifier (held on 24 January).

After the draw was made, Gerwyn Price and Michael van Gerwen withdrew from the tournament due to medical reasons. Michael Smith and Callan Rydz replaced them from the reserve list, going straight in at the second-round stage.

Seeded players

1. Luke Littler (ENG) (champion)
2. Luke Humphries (ENG) (semi-finals)
3. Gian van Veen (NED) (runner-up)
4. ~~Michael van Gerwen (NED)~~ (withdrew)
5. Jonny Clayton (WAL) (third round)
6. Gary Anderson (SCO) (second round)
7. Stephen Bunting (ENG) (quarter-finals)
8. Ryan Searle (ENG) (second round)
9. Josh Rock (NIR) (quarter-finals)
10. Danny Noppert (NED) (second round)
11. James Wade (ENG) (second round)
12. ~~Gerwyn Price (WAL)~~ (withdrew)
13. Chris Dobey (ENG) (semi-finals)
14. Nathan Aspinall (ENG) (third round)
15. Martin Schindler (GER) (second round)
16. Ross Smith (ENG) (third round)

PDC Pro Tour Order of Merit qualifiers

- Wessel Nijman (NED) (quarter-finals)
- Damon Heta (AUS) (first round)
- Jermaine Wattimena (NED) (third round)
- Cameron Menzies (SCO) (third round)
- Dirk van Duijvenbode (NED) (first round)
- Luke Woodhouse (ENG) (third round)
- Niko Springer (GER) (first round)
- Ryan Joyce (ENG) (first round)
- William O'Connor (IRL) (second round)
- Mike De Decker (BEL) (second round)
- Joe Cullen (ENG) (second round)
- Krzysztof Ratajski (POL) (second round)
- Dave Chisnall (ENG) (first round)
- Niels Zonneveld (NED) (second round)
- Daryl Gurney (NIR) (second round)
- Andrew Gilding (ENG) (second round)

Tour Card qualifier
- Cristo Reyes (ESP) (third round)
- Connor Scutt (ENG) (second round)
- Ritchie Edhouse (ENG) (first round)
- Adam Gawlas (CZE) (second round)
- Mickey Mansell (IRL) (first round)
- Darryl Pilgrim (ENG) (second round)
- Jeffrey de Graaf (SWE) (first round)
- Thomas Lovely (ENG) (first round)
- Marvin Kraft (GER) (first round)
- Carl Sneyd (ENG) (first round)
Host Nation qualifier
- Mirosław Grudziecki (POL) (first round)
- Krzysztof Kciuk (POL) (first round)
- Dawid Robak (POL) (first round)
- Piotr Maciejczak (POL) (first round)
Nordic & Baltic qualifier
- Andreas Harrysson (SWE) (first round)
East European qualifier
- Boris Krčmar (CRO) (third round)
Reserve list
- Michael Smith (ENG) (quarter-finals)
- Callan Rydz (ENG) (second round)

== Summary ==
=== First round ===
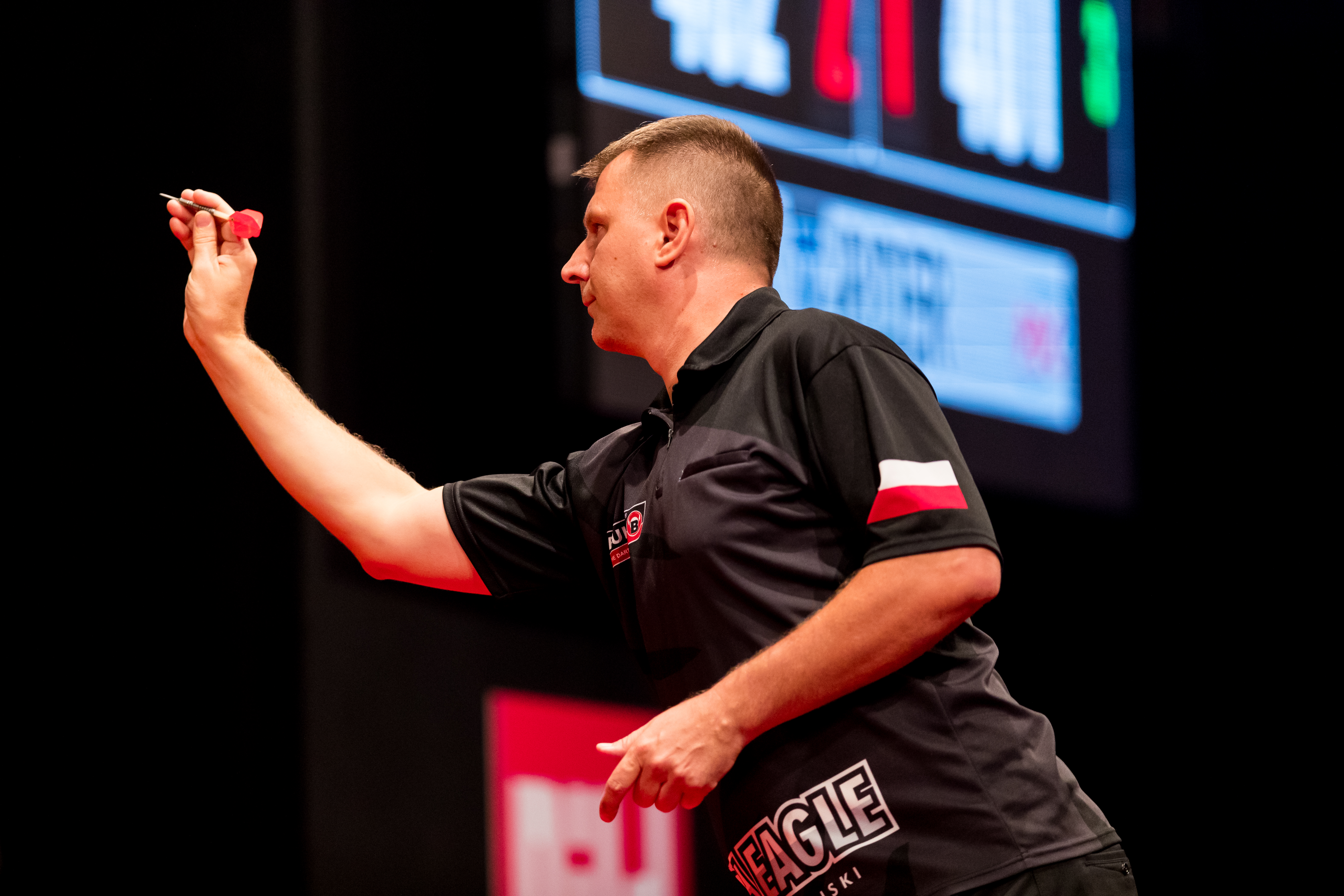
Krzysztof Ratajski (pictured in 2019) was the only Polish player to progress past the first round, defeating Mickey Mansell 6–3 in his opening match.

The first round (best of 11 legs) was played on 20 February. Poland's Krzysztof Ratajski was victorious on home soil, earning a 6–3 victory against Mickey Mansell. "This was one of the most valuable wins in my career, for sure," commented Ratajski. "I was very nervous tonight. The expectation was high, but I played my game and I'm really happy I won for this great crowd." Poland's other four representatives suffered losses to Niels Zonneveld, Jermaine Wattimena, Daryl Gurney and Joe Cullen. The 2024 World Grand Prix champion Mike De Decker defeated European Tour debutant Marvin Kraft 6–4 to set up a second-round tie with world champion Luke Littler. From 3–0 down, the 2023 UK Open champion Andrew Gilding won six consecutive legs to beat Jeffrey de Graaf, finishing the match with a three-dart average of 106.55. Making his first stage appearance since his first-round exit at the 2026 World Championship, Cameron Menzies landed nine maximums on his way to defeating Ritchie Edhouse 6–4. Cristo Reyes hit 60 per cent of his double attempts as he won 6–3 against Niko Springer on his return to the European Tour. Luke Woodhouse claimed a 6–2 victory over debutant Carl Sneyd, while eight-time European Tour winner Dave Chisnall was beaten 6–4 by Darryl Pilgrim. Damon Heta staged a comeback from 4–0 down against Connor Scutt which included a 167 checkout, but Scutt then secured a 6–4 win. East European qualifier Boris Krčmar averaged 102.44 to defeat Ryan Joyce 6–3.

=== Second round ===
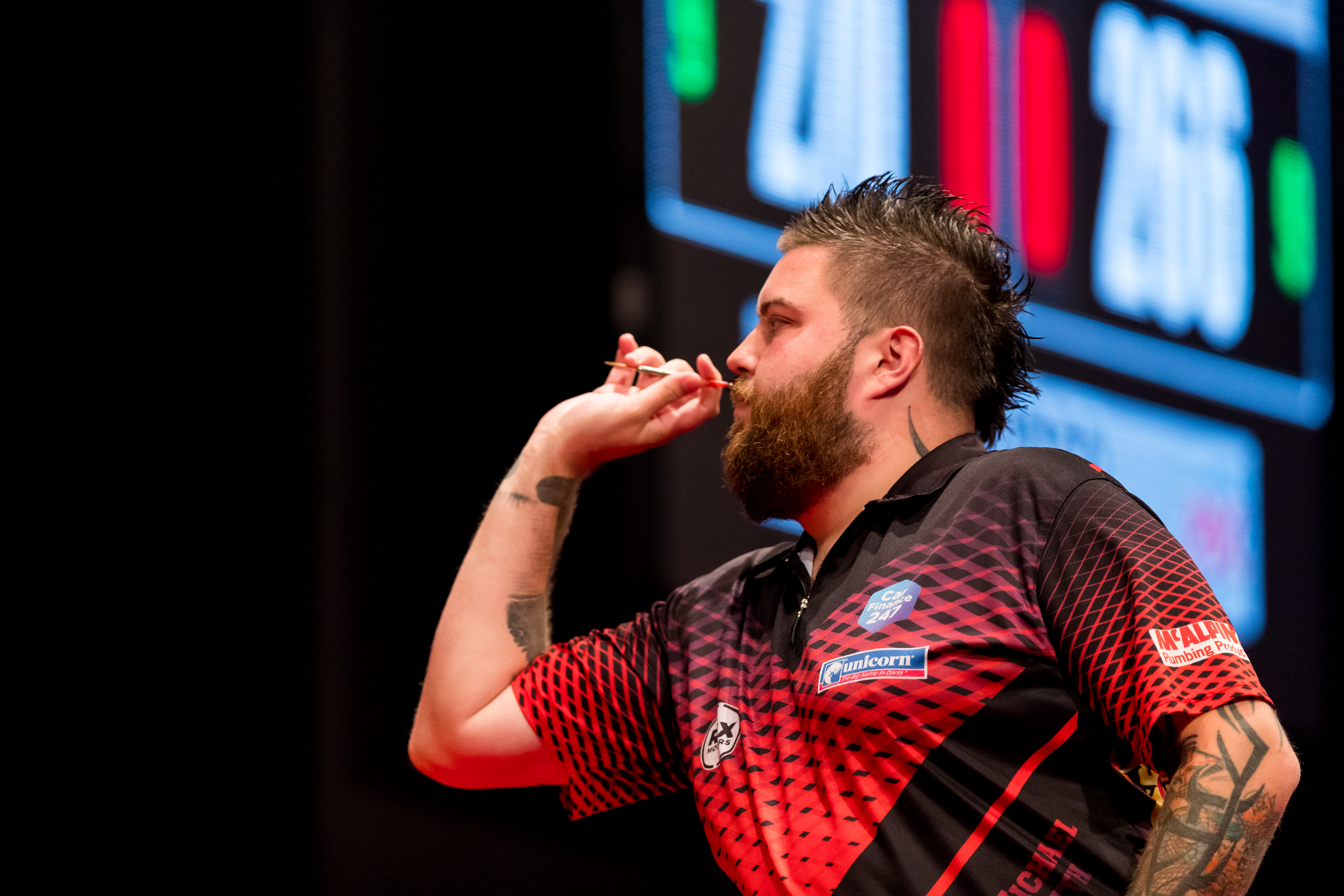
The 2023 world champion Michael Smith (pictured in 2019) entered the tournament following Gerwyn Price's withdrawal. He defeated Joe Cullen 6‍–‍5 in the second round.

The second round (best of 11 legs) was played on 21 February. Luke Littler recorded a three-dart average of 113.84 and hit 100 per cent of his doubles as he defeated Mike De Decker 6–1 to open his campaign. "It's not gone my way in the first three weeks of the Premier League, but I certainly want to be the first winner here in Poland this weekend," said Littler afterwards. After initially taking a 4–1 lead, world number two Luke Humphries was brought to a deciding leg by Krzysztof Ratajski, where Humphries eventually secured a 6–5 win. Speaking about the partisan Polish crowd after the match, Humphries said: "It's just sometimes, when you get crowds that, unfortunately, don't give you that kind of fair game that you want it is hard for me to perform." World Championship runner-up Gian van Veen, the reigning European champion, also survived a last-leg decider, earning a 6–5 victory over Andrew Gilding. Jonny Clayton, who entered the tournament having won a Premier League night in Glasgow, defeated Adam Gawlas 6–4, while Stephen Bunting overcame 17 missed darts at double to beat Niels Zonneveld by the same scoreline. The 2023 world champion Michael Smith replaced Gerwyn Price in the second round and claimed a 6–5 victory over Joe Cullen; on the other hand, Luke Woodhouse won five consecutive legs to win 6–4 against reserve player Callan Rydz, who replaced Michael van Gerwen.

Josh Rock began his tournament by averaging 102.98 on his way to beating William O'Connor 6–1, while Ross Smith claimed his own 6–1 win against Daryl Gurney. Wessel Nijman averaged 103.46 in his 6–2 victory over two-time world champion Gary Anderson. "I don't know how I keep beating him," remarked Nijman, who achieved his fourth consecutive win against Anderson. James Wade and Connor Scutt suffered whitewash defeats to Cameron Menzies and Chris Dobey, respectively. Cristo Reyes progressed to the final day of a European Tour event for the first time since 2018, beating Ryan Searle 6–2. Nathan Aspinall, the top performer on the 2025 European Tour, defeated Darryl Pilgrim 6–3. Danny Noppert missed three match darts in his 6–5 loss to Jermaine Wattimena, while Boris Krčmar continued his run by winning 6–4 against Martin Schindler.

=== Final day ===
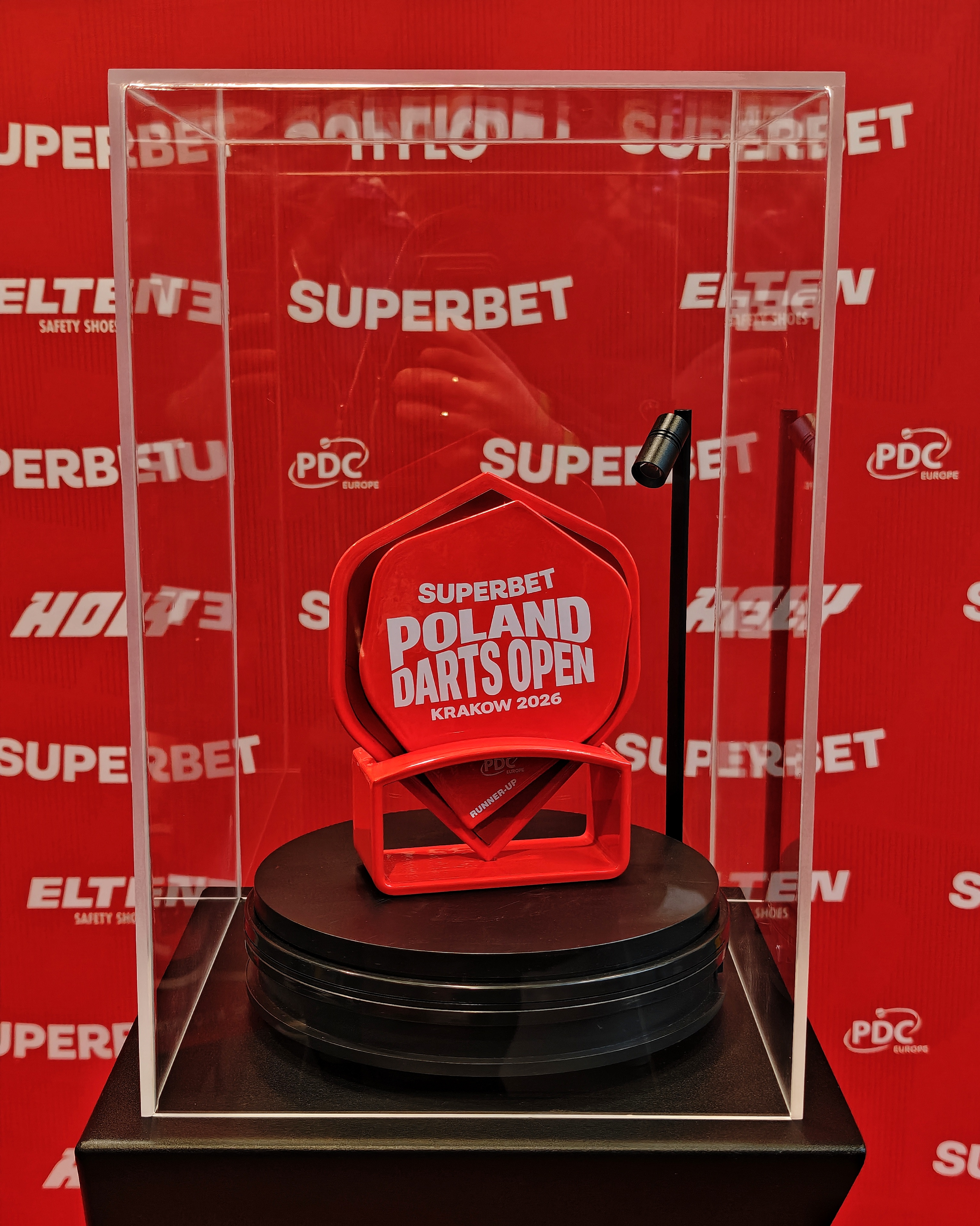
The Poland Darts Open trophy

The third round, quarter-finals, semi-finals and final were played on 22 February. The third round and quarter-finals were contested over the best of 11 legs, the semi-finals over the best of 13 legs, and the final over the best of 15 legs. The final day saw Luke Littler and Gian van Veen reach the final. Littler overturned a 2–0 deficit to beat Ross Smith 6–2—his seventh straight win against the Englishman—before securing comfortable victories against Josh Rock and Chris Dobey, averaging 105.91 in the latter contest. Van Veen defeated Nathan Aspinall in a deciding leg after initially going 4–2 down, and followed that win by beating Wessel Nijman 6–2 with a three-dart average of 107.50. In the semi-finals, Van Veen defeated Luke Humphries 7–5 to set up a tie with Littler, marking his seventh triumph over Humphries in eight meetings. A rematch of the 2026 World Championship final that Littler won 7–1, Van Veen was looking to avenge that loss and claim his maiden European Tour title, while Littler aimed to add to his four European Tour titles.

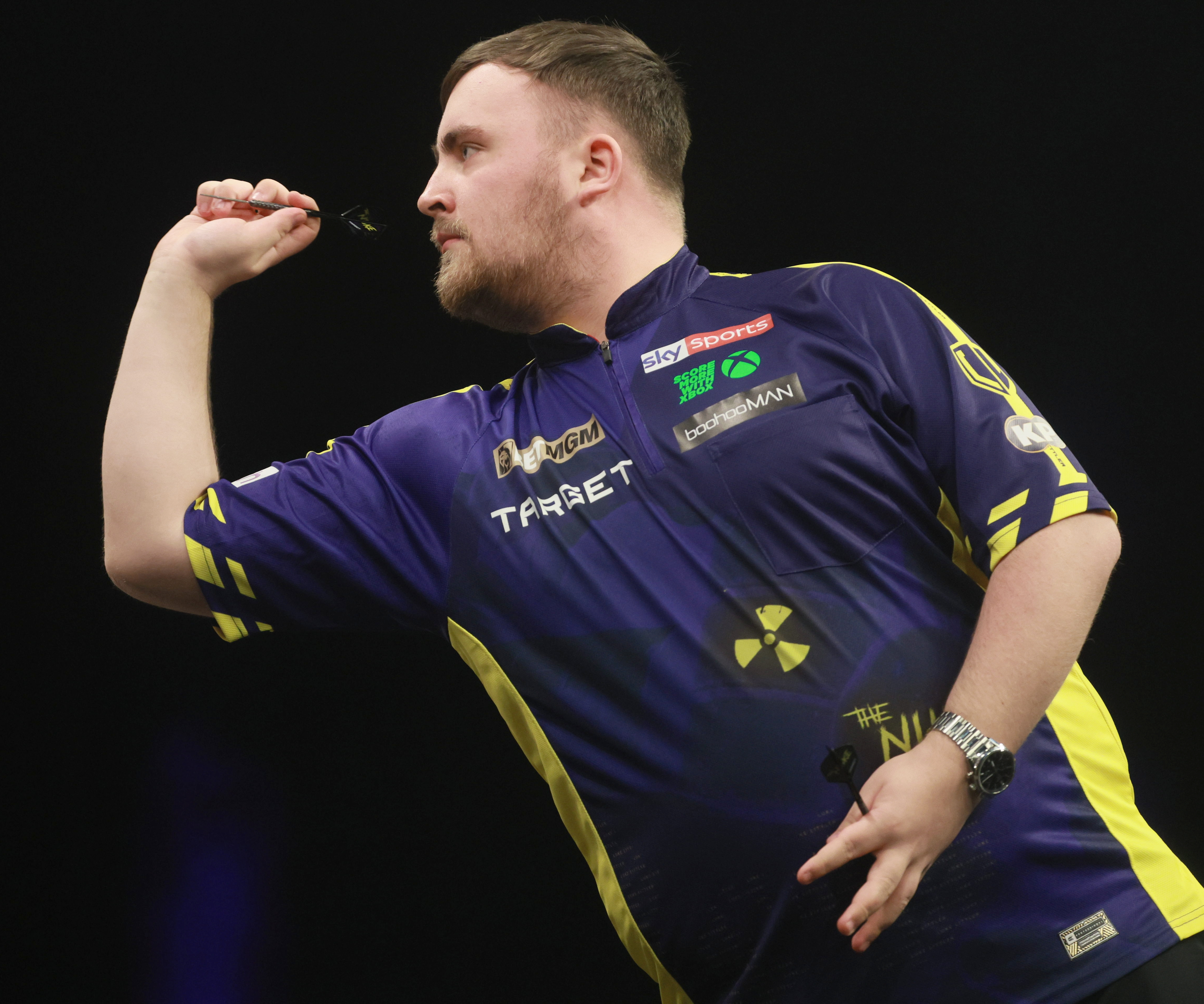
Luke Littler (pictured in 2025) won the inaugural Poland Darts Open by defeating Gian van Veen 8–4 in the final.

The first four legs of the final were holds of throw. In the fifth leg, Van Veen followed back-to-back maximums with a 141 checkout to complete a nine-dart finish and go 3–2 ahead, his first nine-darter on stage. The 141 finish was his second ton-plus checkout of the match, having converted 112 earlier in the contest. Littler then took control, winning the next four legs to lead 6–3. Van Veen ended Littler's run with a 74 finish in the tenth leg, but Littler claimed the next two in a total of 28 darts to win the match 8–4, pinning double 10 to secure victory. He finished the match with seven maximums and a three-dart average of 108.06.

Littler won the inaugural Poland Darts Open, his fifth European Tour title in 714 days. In his post-match interview, he revealed that Van Veen's nine-dart finish spurred him on to victory. "In the past people have hit nine-darters against me and it's a big achievement. It's not easy to do. In the final, so early, I was like just go for him now while he's a bit overwhelmed," he commented, adding that he hoped he could take his performances onto the next Premier League night in Belfast. Speaking in defeat, Van Veen admitted that he wished he missed the nine-darter, explaining: "Of course I'm very happy to hit the nine-darter, but I think everyone noticed in the next two or three legs, I wasn't good. I was so excited about the nine-darter—my first one on the stage, and that probably cost me the final today." He added: "I'm getting a bit tired of losing finals now, but it's part of the game and I'm happy to make another final. It's been a great weekend."

== Draw ==
The draw was announced on 19 February. Numbers to the left of a player's name show the seedings for the top 16 in the tournament. The figures to the right of a player's name state their three-dart average in a match. The two reserve players are indicated by 'Alt'. Players in bold denote match winners.

**First round** (best of 11 legs); 20 February
**Mike De Decker 83.98**	**6**
Marvin Kraft 79.39	4
**Daryl Gurney 87.82**	**6**
Dawid Robak 79.77	1
Niko Springer 88.65	3
**Cristo Reyes 93.04**	**6**
**William O'Connor 96.15**	**6**
Andreas Harrysson 98.07	4
**Luke Woodhouse 93.91**	**6**
Carl Sneyd 84.15	2
Damon Heta 96.28	4
**Connor Scutt 98.32**	**6**
Dirk van Duijvenbode 94.06	3
**Adam Gawlas 89.51**	**6**
**Joe Cullen 99.85**	**6**
Krzysztof Kciuk 86.97	2
**Krzysztof Ratajski 96.14**	**6**
Mickey Mansell 98.42	3
Ryan Joyce 101.48	3
**Boris Krčmar 102.44**	**6**
**Niels Zonneveld 92.10**	**6**
Piotr Maciejczak 82.04	2
**Jermaine Wattimena 86.73**	**6**
Mirosław Grudziecki 75.46	4
**Andrew Gilding 106.55**	**6**
Jeffrey de Graaf 97.78	3
Dave Chisnall 84.78	4
**Darryl Pilgrim 87.42**	**6**
**Wessel Nijman 88.56**	**6**
Thomas Lovely 85.95	3
**Cameron Menzies 95.21**	**6**
Ritchie Edhouse 89.31	4

**Second round** (best of 11 legs); 21 February
**1**	**Luke Littler 113.84**	**6**
Mike De Decker 100.02	1
**16**	**Ross Smith 102.27**	**6**
Daryl Gurney 93.98	1
8	Ryan Searle 93.56	2
**Cristo Reyes 99.62**	**6**
**9**	**Josh Rock 102.98**	**6**
William O'Connor 92.42	1
Alt	Callan Rydz 95.12	4
**Luke Woodhouse 102.60**	**6**
**13**	**Chris Dobey 94.93**	**6**
Connor Scutt 87.60	0
**5**	**Jonny Clayton 95.72**	**6**
Adam Gawlas 91.00	4
**Alt**	**Michael Smith 97.01**	**6**
Joe Cullen 91.66	5
**2**	**Luke Humphries 97.17**	**6**
Krzysztof Ratajski 99.59	5
15	Martin Schindler 86.98	4
**Boris Krčmar 94.59**	**6**
**7**	**Stephen Bunting 88.06**	**6**
Niels Zonneveld 90.52	4
10	Danny Noppert 103.11	5
**Jermaine Wattimena 100.73**	**6**
**3**	**Gian van Veen 95.28**	**6**
Andrew Gilding 96.54	5
**14**	**Nathan Aspinall 96.95**	**6**
Darryl Pilgrim 101.68	3
6	Gary Anderson 97.21	2
**Wessel Nijman 103.46**	**6**
11	James Wade 87.45	0
**Cameron Menzies 99.10**	**6**

**Third round** (best of 11 legs); 22 February
**1**	**Littler 100.07**	**6**
16	R Smith 91.84	2
Reyes 92.63	3
**9**	**Rock 98.57**	**6**
Woodhouse 90.72	5
**13**	**Dobey 91.59**	**6**
5	Clayton 92.44	4
**Alt**	**M Smith 90.57**	**6**
**2**	**Humphries 96.41**	**6**
Krčmar 88.58	1
**7**	**Bunting 100.09**	**6**
Wattimena 96.94	1
**3**	**van Veen 95.90**	**6**
14	Aspinall 100.05	5
**Nijman 102.00**	**6**
Menzies 90.33	1

**Quarter-finals** (best of 11 legs); 22 February
**1**	**Littler 98.97**	**6**
9	Rock 95.16	1
**13**	**Dobey 90.05**	**6**
Alt	M Smith 83.45	2
**2**	**Humphries 92.03**	**6**
7	Bunting 88.47	1
**3**	**van Veen 107.50**	**6**
Nijman 96.09	2

**Semi-finals** (best of 13 legs); 22 February
**1**	**Littler 105.91**	**7**
13	Dobey 93.73	3
2	Humphries 97.66	5
**3**	**van Veen 97.43**	**7**

**Final** (best of 15 legs); 22 February
**1**	**Littler 108.06**	**8**
3	van Veen 96.11	4
