= Slashing =

Slashing may refer to:

- Slashing (fashion), a technique in historic European fashion
- Slashing (ice hockey), a penalty in ice hockey where a player swings his stick at another

== See also ==
- Slash (disambiguation)
- Slasher (disambiguation)
