= Anna reactor =

Polish research nuclear reactor

The Anna reactor was a Polish research nuclear reactor of graphite-water design. Construction began in 1961 in a dedicated building in the Institute for Nuclear Research in Otwock near Warsaw. The Anna reactor was commissioned on June 12, 1963, thus becoming the second and eventually the third most powerful nuclear reactor in Poland (after Maria and Ewa).

The Anna reactor, was constructed of 14 by 14 cm graphite blocks, 245 cm long, which were arranged in an octagon with a diameter of 270 cm. The fuel was concentric tubes containing uranium enriched to 20%. According to the design assumptions, there could be a maximum of 25 fuel elements, however, most often 16 were worked on. The core was additionally surrounded by a reflector and had an external neutron source used for start-up. The purpose of the Anna reactor was scientific and research work, and for a certain period also small-scale production of radioisotopes.

Between 1964 and 1971, the Anna reactor was included in an international research program co-financed by the International Atomic Energy Agency. The purpose of the program was research in reactor physics, including studies of changes in neutron flux over time, operator training and exchange of operational experience.

In March 1972, the Anna reactor was extensively modified. In particular, the central part of the core was replaced, which was filled with natural uranium without a moderator (and thus becoming fast-neutron reactor). The outer part was a ring with a layout from the previous version. Modified reactor was named P-ANNA (short for Prędka Anna, meaning Fast Anna in Polish) and was used for research on fast neutrons.

The Anna reactor had a power of 10 kW_{thermal}, its own control room and a separate reactor building, shared with the Agata reactor and the Helena subcritical reactor. The Anna reactor was a unit completely designed and built in Poland by Polish engineers and nuclear physicists. It operated on EK-10 nuclear fuel manufactured by the USSR. The reactor was decommissioned in the 1980s. The reactor hall, along with many pieces of equipment, is still located at the National Center for Nuclear Research in Otwock. The entire reactor body still exists, along with the control room and mostly dismantled auxiliary systems. After fuel removal and decontamination, further work with the Anna reactor was discontinued.

== See also ==
- Ewa reactor
- Maria reactor
