= Slasher =

Slasher may refer to:

- Slasher (basketball), a style of play in basketball
- Slasher film, a subgenre of the horror film
- Slasher (tool), a scrub-clearing implement
- Slasher (2004 film), a 2004 documentary film
- Slasher (2007 film), a 2007 horror film
- Slasher (TV series), a 2016 horror-drama TV series
- John Reis (born 1969), American musician, known by the pseudonym Slasher
- Common thresher, a large species of thresher shark, sometimes called "slashers"

== See also ==
- Slash (disambiguation)
- Slashers (disambiguation)
- /r/ (disambiguation)
