= List of firsts in Poland =

This is a list of firsts in Poland.

== Politics and government ==
- First President: Gabriel Narutowicz (1865–1922): served from 11 December 1922 until he was assassinated by Eligiusz Niewiadomski five days later.
- First Prime Minister: Stanisław Małachowski (1736–1809): 5 October 1807 - 14 December 1807.
- First female Prime minister: Hanna Suchocka.
- First openly gay member of the Polish Sejm: Robert Biedroń.
- First openly transgender member of the Polish Sejm: Anna Grodzka
- First member of the Polish Sejm of African origin: John Godson, 2010-2015.
- First openly gay mayor: Robert Biedroń.

== Education and academia ==
- First university: Jagiellonian University, founded in 1364.

== Science and technology ==
- First railway: Wrocław to Oława (then in German territory) completed on 22 May 1842.
- First airport: aeroplanes flew from Elbląg Airport (then in German territory, and now closed) in 1912.
- First welded road bridge: Maurzyce Bridge ended in 1928, first road bridge in these technic in world
- First nuclear reactor: The Ewa reactor R1 in the Instytut Badań Jądrowych (Institute of Nuclear Research), started on July 13, 1954.
- First motorway: Warszawa-Katowice, so called "Gierkówka", 1976.
- First line of the Warsaw Metro: Kabaty to Politechinka, opened on April 7, 1995.

== Culture ==
- First official translation of the Bible: St. Florian's Psalter (Psałterz floriański), 14th cent.
- First theatre: The National Theatre (Teatr Narodowy) in Warsaw, 1765

== Other ==
- First school shooting in Polish history: Wilno school massacre
