= Maria reactor =

Nuclear research reactor

Coordinates: 52.1228°N 21.3439°E

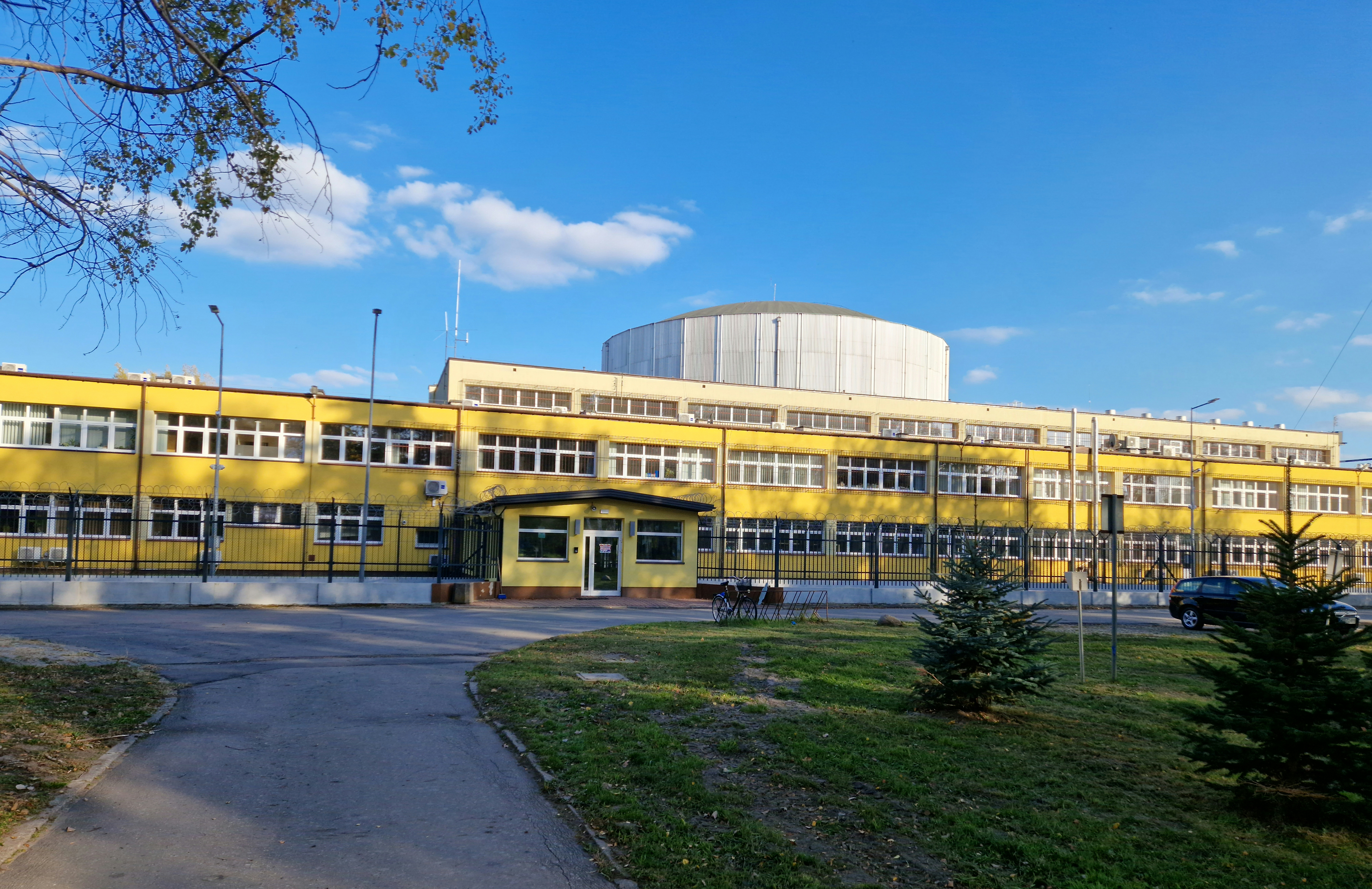
The Maria reactor

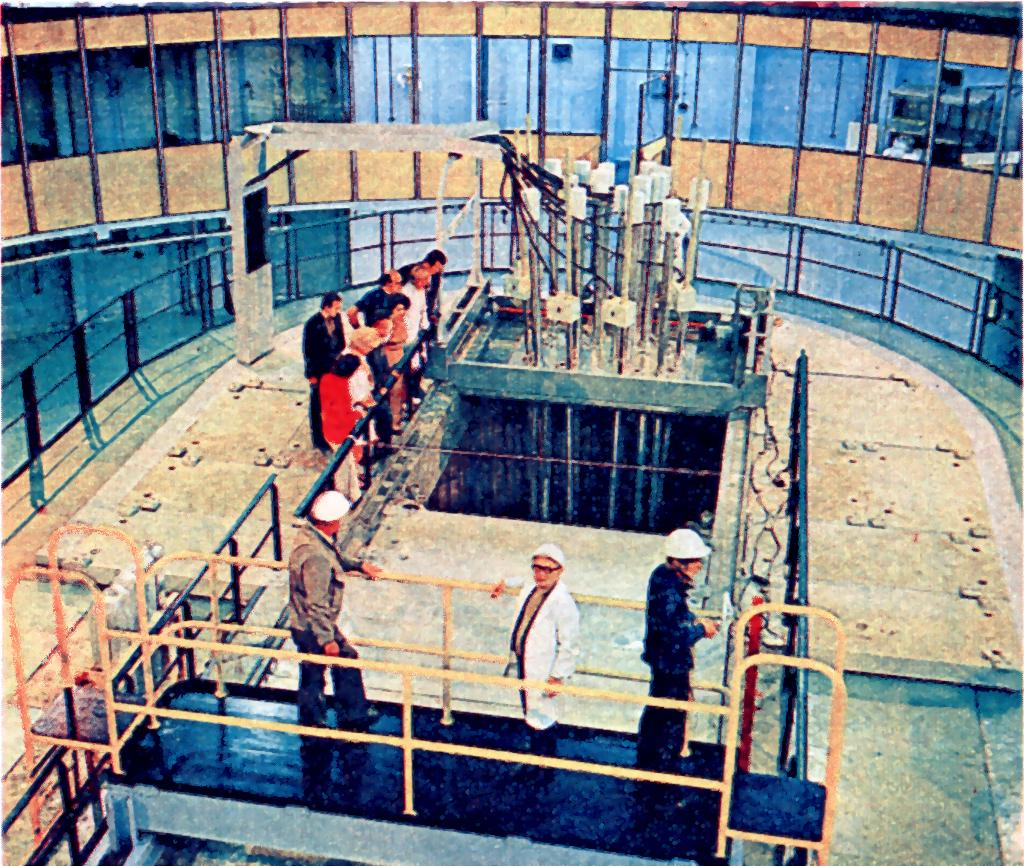
The reactor during construction

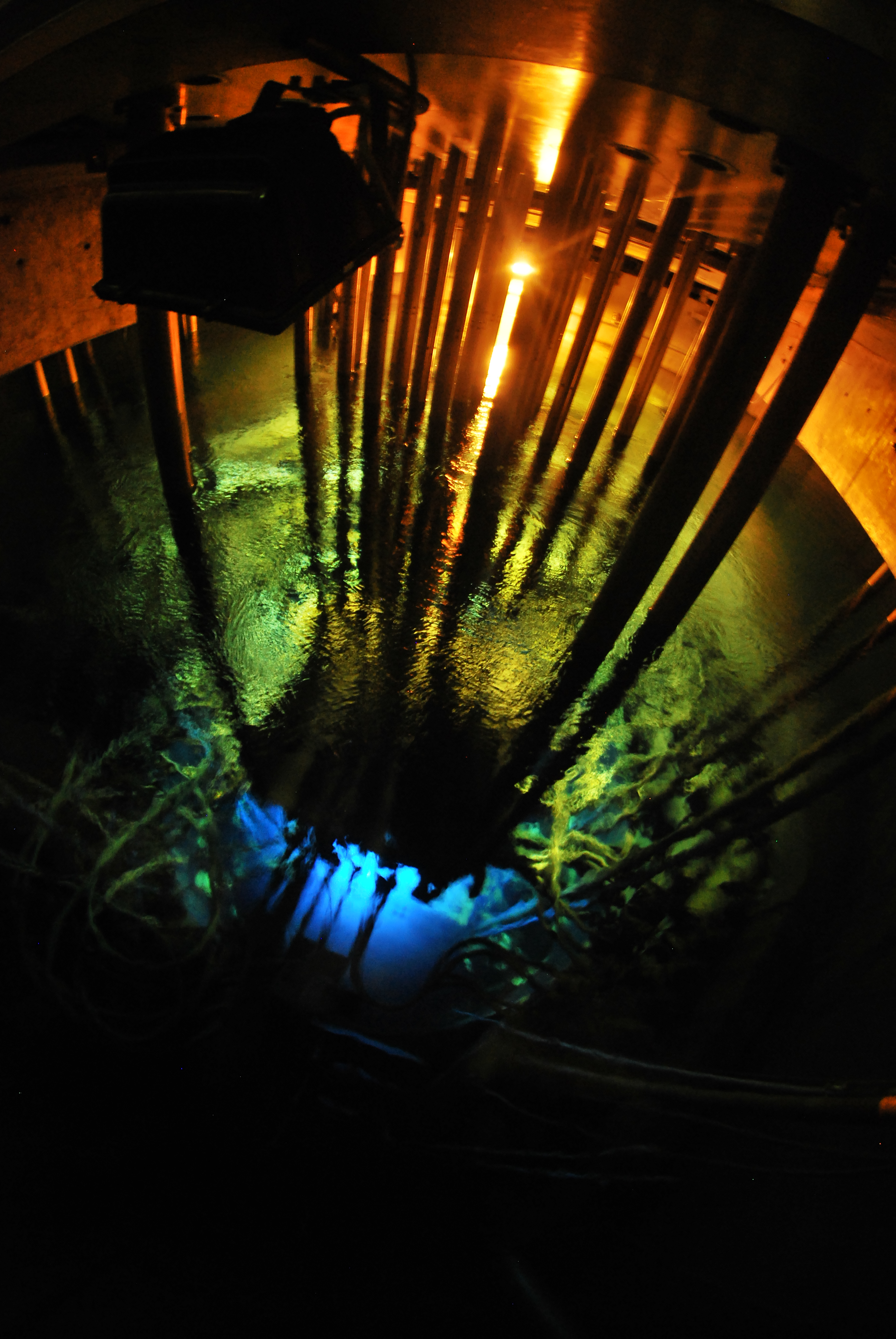
Cherenkov radiation viewed in the interior of the Maria reactor

The Maria reactor is Poland's second nuclear research reactor, commissioned in December 1974, and the only one still in use as of 2026. The first was the Ewa reactor (EWA), which was commissioned in June 1958 and dismantled by 2002. It is run by the National Centre for Nuclear Research (NCBJ) at Świerk-Otwock, is located near Warsaw and is named in honour of Maria Skłodowska-Curie. It is the only reactor of Polish design.

Research done with Maria includes the production of radioisotopes, research using neutron beams, neutron therapy, and neutron activation analysis. It operates for about 4,000 hours annually, usually in blocks of 100 hours.

== Technical description ==
The technical details of the reactor are given in the references.

Maria is a pool-type reactor with a power of 30 MW (thermal). Despite being a pool reactor, it contains channels (aluminum tubes) individually connected to the primary coolant. The water pool provides cooling for elements (e.g., fuel elements) that are not otherwise cooled, and also acts as radiation shielding. Maria uses enriched uranium as fuel (80% enrichment in ^{235}U till 1999, and 36% since). The fuel elements and channels are vertical but arranged conically. Water and beryllium blocks serve as the moderator (70% and 30% of the moderation, respectively). Elements of boron carbide sheathed in aluminum are utilized for control, compensation, and safety. The use of beryllium blocks permits a comparatively large fuel lattice pitch, and consequently large volume for payload targets. There is also a graphite reflector (aluminum sheathed). Maria supplies a neutron flux of 4 × 10^{14} n/cm^{2}s (thermal neutrons) and 2 × 10^{14} n/cm^{2}s (fast neutrons). There are six horizontal channels for controlled use of neutron beams. There is also a window of lead-containing glass through which the core can be viewed. The reactor is housed in a sealed containment.

Following preparation which started in 2004, Maria was converted to use low-enriched uranium (LEU) fuel by 2012.

== History ==
Construction began on 16 June 1970, and the reactor was activated on 18 December 1974. With the shutdown of the Ewa reactor in 1995 it became Poland's only research nuclear reactor.

In 2015, Maria was relicensed for an additional ten years of operation, until 2025. On 1 April 2025, the Maria reactor was temporarily shut down due to the licence ending and was not expected to resume operations before the renewal of its licence (expected no earlier than 8 May 2025).

== Production of medical radioisotopes ==
In February 2010, it was announced that Maria would start producing medical isotopes in cooperation with Covidien, to help ease the isotope shortages due to shutdowns of the Canadian NRU reactor and the Dutch Petten nuclear reactor.

== See also ==
- Anna reactor
- List of nuclear reactors
