= Krystyna Dańko =

Polish Righteous Among the Nations

- Portrait from before the Holocaust
- Born: Krystyna Chłond; 9 July 1917; Otwock, Vistula Land
- Died: 6 August 2019 (aged 102); Warsaw, Poland
- Known for: Polish Righteous among the Nations
- Spouse: Mieczysław Dańko
- Children: 3

Krystyna Dańko, née Chłond (9 July 1917 – 6 August 2019), was a Polish orphan from the town of Otwock, daughter of Karol Chłond – a respected city official in prewar Poland – who was awarded the title of Righteous among the Nations by Yad Vashem in 1998, for saving the lives of Polish Jews during the Holocaust while risking her own life at the time of the Nazi German occupation of Poland.

Krystyna Dańko received her medal at the request of Maryna (Maria) Bartoń, née Kokoszko, whom she "smuggled" into a safer place from Otwock to Warsaw, where Maryna's extended family could take care of her. Unafraid of endangering her own life, Krystyna helped her Jewish friends by giving them food she bought, clothing as well as money, and by fulfilling their heartfelt requests.

Several years before the outbreak of World War II, Krystyna Dańko established a close friendship with Lusia, the eldest daughter of the Kokoszko family, who was her high school classmate. Krystyna spent a great deal of time in their home. Once the Holocaust began, she did everything in her power to help the family survive the Nazis. "I was never afraid of anything", she said.

== Rescuing the Kokoszkos ==
After the Kokoszkos' successful escape from the ghetto, Krystyna helped to hide them, including the father, mother and Helena (Lusia), in a secret location at a nearby village. She took the youngest daughter, age 11, on a train to the capital, where the girl was placed in a Polish orphanage in Warsaw under an assumed name.

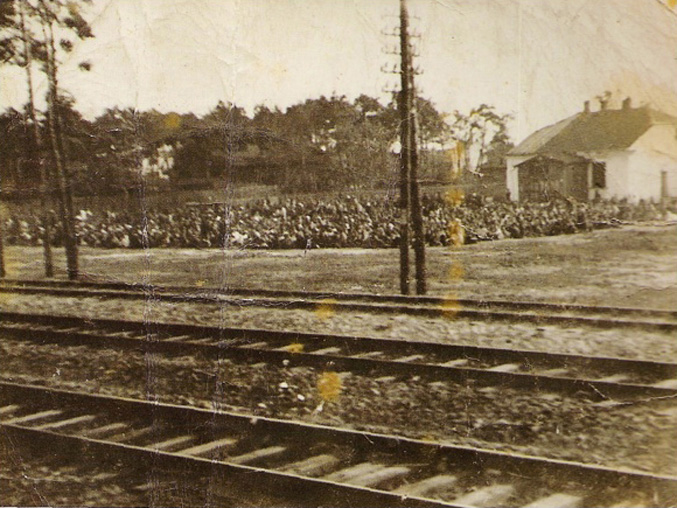
Layover yard in Otwock, August 19, 1942. In the distance, Jews sit on the ground overnight, while awaiting transport to Treblinka extermination camp. Clandestine photo

Krystyna became the liaison between the family and their youngest child, delivering messages and information back and forth. Krystyna asked nothing in return for her heroic effort, stating that helping others was her moral obligation as a human being. Otwock Ghetto was liquidated on 19 September 1942, when 75% of its Jewish population, numbering around 8,000, was assembled at a layover yard in Otwock (pictured) and shipped to the Treblinka death camp. Jews who remained were summarily shot on Reymonta Street thereafter.

In 1951 Krystyna Dańko, née Chłond, married Mieczysław Dańko, a social activist from Otwock persecuted by the Stalinist regime. He died in 1982. She turned 100 in July 2017. Krystyna was honoured in Jerusalem as Righteous Among the Nations on 13 December 1998 for helping to save the lives of Eugenia, Helena, Maria, and Dr. Michał Kokoszko who settled in Warsaw after the war. The eyewitness testimony came from the youngest daughter of the Kokoszko family, Maria Kokoszko-Barton who submitted her deposition to Yad Vashem.

Two other members of Dańko family were awarded their medals posthumously on 16 December 2008: Jadwiga Dańko, née Wojciechowska, (1904–1968) and her husband Mieczysław Dańko (1905–1982) who separately saved the Weczer family in Otwock. When members of the Weczer family arrived to the United States, the immigration office incorrectly wrote Wecer in the entry documents. Thus, Weczer which was pronounced (Wɛčər), went on to be pronounced as (Wɛsər).
