= Jarosław Margielski =

Polish politician (born 1987)

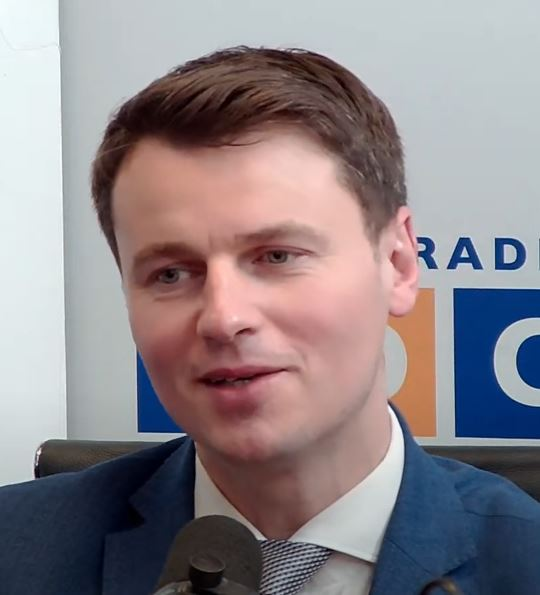

Mayor of Otwock
- Incumbent
- Assumed office 17 November 2018
- Preceded by: Zbigniew Szczepaniak

Personal details
- Born: 28 September 1987 (age 38)
- Party: Law and Justice

Jarosław Margielski (born 28 September 1987) is a Polish politician serving as mayor of Otwock since 2018. From 2014 to 2018, he served as chairman of the city council. Ahead of the 2025 presidential election, he was one of the candidates considered by Law and Justice for president of Poland.
