= Zofiówka Sanatorium =

Defunct mental hospital in Otwock, Poland

- Defunct
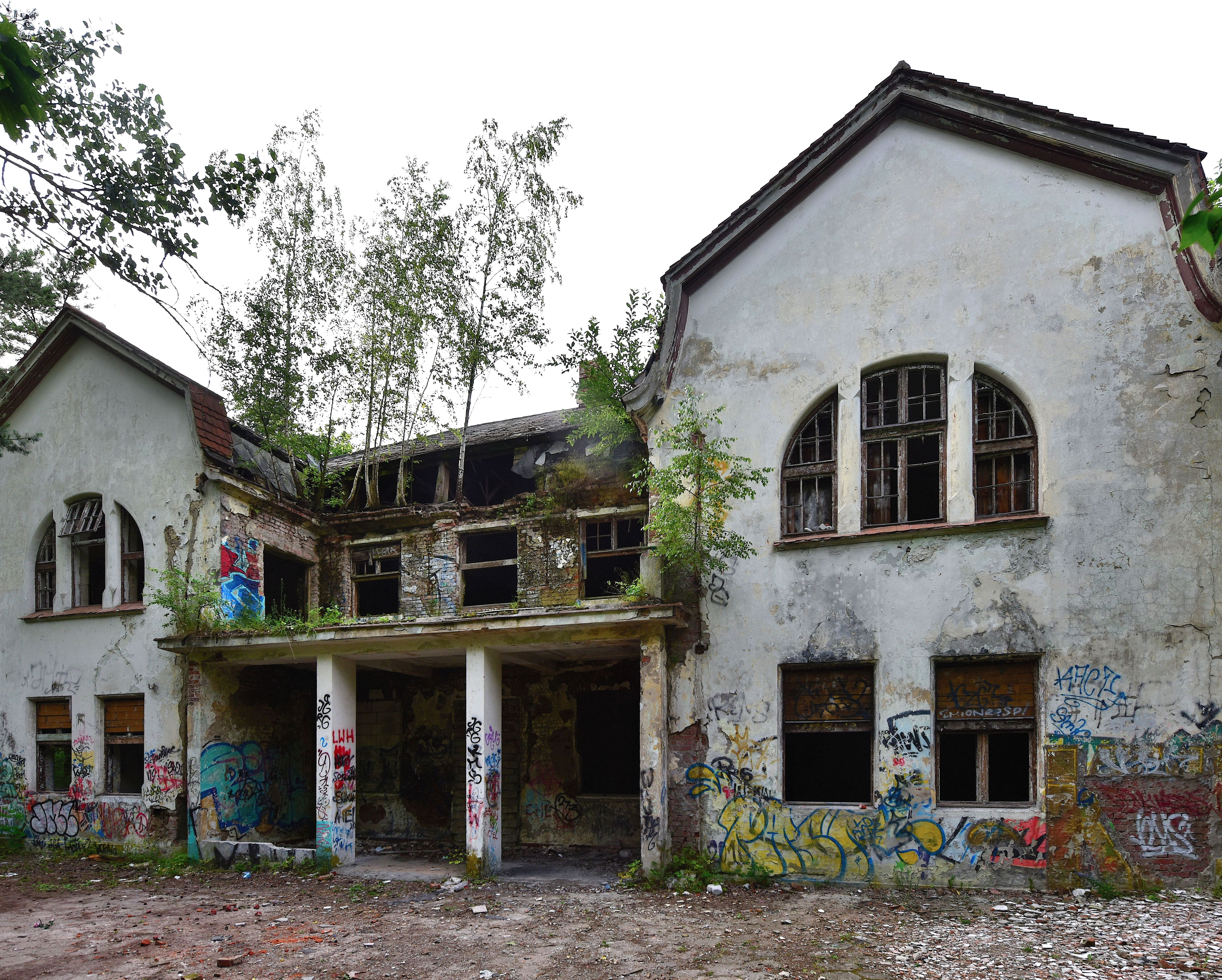
- Abandoned building of the Zofiówka Sanatorium, photographed in 2017

- Location in Poland

Geography
- Location: Otwock, Poland, PL
- Coordinates: 52.114192°N 21.289569°E

History
- Closed: 1990s

Links
- Media related to Zofiówka Sanatorium at Wikimedia Commons

Zofiówka Sanatorium is a defunct mental health facility in the town of Otwock in Poland, built at the beginning of the 20th century. In the Second Polish Republic, the sanatorium complex was expanded with more buildings and staff. Zofiówka initially had 95 beds, but this number had increased to 275 by 1935. The Jewish history of Zofiówka came to its end in the course of the Holocaust following the invasion of Poland by Nazi Germany.

== Construction ==
The history of the old Jewish sanatorium starts at the beginning of the 20th century. Back then, the institutionalized treatment of mental disorders was in its infancy. In 1906, Polish-Jewish neurologists Adam Wizel, Samuel Goldflam, Ludwik Bregman and Adolf Weisblat formed the "Society for Poor Jews with Nervous and Mental Illnesses" (Polish: Towarzystwo Opieki nad Ubogimi, Nerwowo i Umysłowo Chorymi Żydami). The sanatorium's director was Dr. Stefan Miller. A year later, a donation by the philanthropist Sophia Endelman enabled the purchase of 17 hectares of land and in 1908 the first building of a new sanatorium was built by the association there. An important part of the treatment was restoring patients to society by enabling them to practice employment. Adela Tuwim, the mother of famous Polish poet Julian Tuwim, was admitted before World War II to the sanatorium's isolation ward, which housed its most difficult patients.

== Holocaust history ==
In late 1940, the asylum fell within the so-called "medical zone" formed by the Germans in the newly established Jewish ghetto of Otwock. The institution was still working during the early stages of the occupation of Poland, but the conditions dramatically worsened. Almost 400 patients were sentenced to a slow and torturous death by starvation as part of the Nazi extermination Aktionen. Zofiówka ended its existence at the same time as the ghetto in Otwock.

On the morning of 19 August 1942, the Ukrainian Trawnikis, supervised by the Germans, gathered the patients and hospital staff into the first pavilion, after which some 100–140 victims were shot on the spot. The rest were put on the Holocaust train to Treblinka along with Otwock’s Jewish population of 7,000. Only a few doctors, who managed to escape to Warsaw by ambulance, survived. Some staff chose to commit suicide.

In 1943, Zofiówka served Germans as Lebensborn, becoming a charitable care institution. The facility also dealt with the forced Germanization of Polish children, tending to them until their adoption by German families.

== After World War II ==
Zofiówka returned to its original medical purposes after the Soviet takeover, but the patients were mainly children and youths. Between 1985 and the mid-1990s, the facilities were used to treat neuropsychiatric disorders associated with drug addiction. This continued until the decision was made to finally close it.

In 2015, the viral video known as 11B-X-1371 was found filmed in the abandoned facility, but who did so and when, exactly, was not known until an individual named Parker Warner Wright claimed to have created the video. He told The Daily Dot that it was supposed to be an art project, and he later released a sequel video entitled 11B-3-1369.

== Bibliography ==
- Mary V. Seeman: The Jewish psychiatric hospital, Zofiówka, in Otwock, Poland, 2014, in History of Psychiatry, March 2015
- Rael Strous: Extermination of the Jewish Mentally-Ill during the Nazi Era – The „Doubly Cursed“, 2008, Isr J Psychiatry Relat Sci Vol 45 No 4, p. 247–256.
