= Ewa reactor =

Nuclear reactor in Poland

Coordinates: 52°07′23″N 21°20′39″E

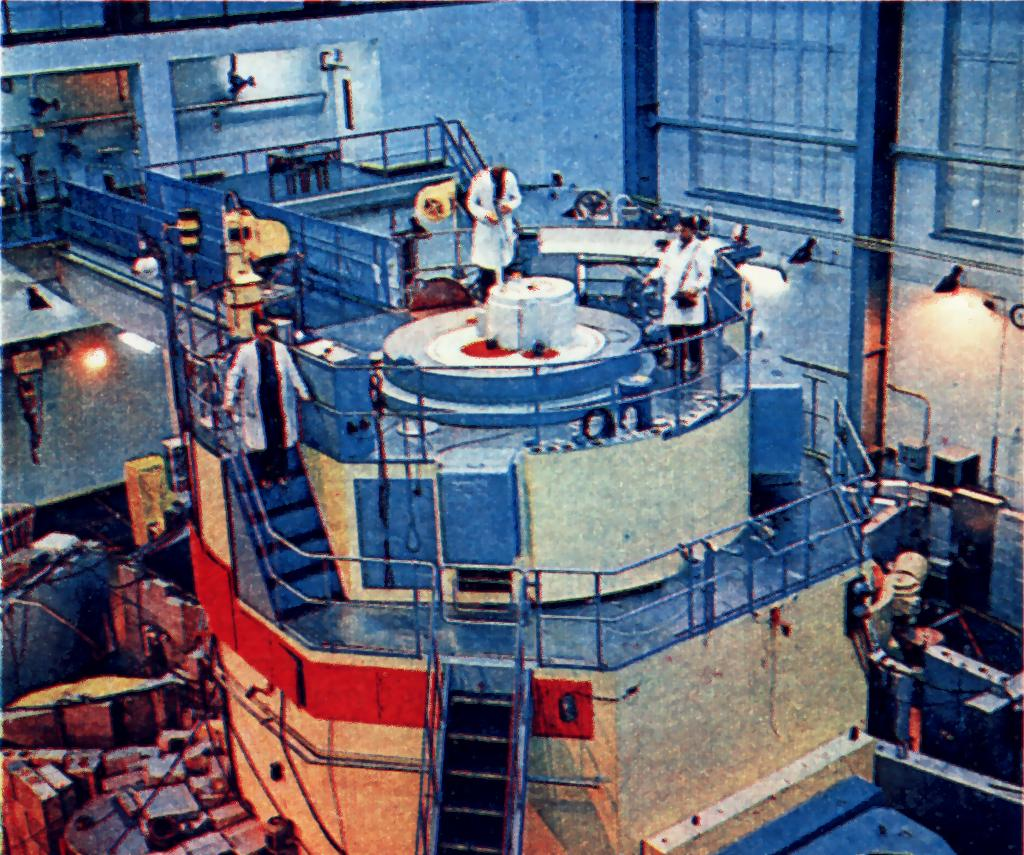
EWA Reactor in the year 1974

The EWA Reactor was Poland's first research nuclear reactor. The name of the reactor is an acronym derived from the first letters of the Polish words: Eksperymentalny (Experimental), Wodny (Water), and Atomowy (Atomic).

The image of the reactor was placed on the reverse side of the 20,000 Polish złoty banknote. On the front of the banknote, there is an image of Maria Skłodowska-Curie, a Polish and naturalised-French physicist and chemist who conducted pioneering research on radioactivity. She was the first woman to receive the Nobel Prize in 1903.

== History ==
The reactor was activated on June 14, 1958, in the Instytut Badań Jądrowych (Institute of Nuclear Research) (Currently the Instytut Energii Atomowej [Atomic Energy Institute] ) in Otwock near Warsaw. In February 1995, the reactor was shut down due to the wear of individual components and materials. The decommissioning process began in 1997. By 2002, the nuclear fuel and high-level substances had been removed, and the reactor was dismantled.

Ewa was based on the Soviet VVR-S design, had an initial power of 2 MW, was fueled by enriched uranium, and moderated by pressurized water. In 1963 and 1967, the reactor underwent two major overhauls that improved the safety of the reaction and allowed for the use of better enriched fuels. After these changes, the reactor's power increased first to 4 MW and ultimately to 10 MW. Its primary use was for producing radioactive isotopes. It functioned an average of 3,500 hours a year.

Because of its design, the reactor is currently considered a potential site for the future site of storage of the spent fuel from the Maria reactor.

== See also ==
- Maria reactor
- Anna reactor
- List of nuclear reactors
