= Kraina Grzybów TV =

Polish artistic universe created by Wiktor Stribog

Kraina Grzybów TV (Mushroom Land TV) is a Polish artistic universe created by Wiktor Stribog, published on a YouTube channel. The core element of Kraina Grzybów is a surreal psychological horror web series called Poradnik Uśmiechu (Smile Guide). With subtitles in several languages, including English, German, Czech, Russian and Italian, it became popular in many countries.

== Plot overview ==
Małgosia the Squirrel - one of the programme's characters and its mascot

Poradnik Uśmiechu is a show without a concrete plot. The story is based on the theme of mushrooms, and the undefined, eponymous land in which the main character—a teenage girl named Agatka—is located. She is the host of an imaginary educational show Poradnik Uśmiechu on the fictional channel Kraina Grzybów TV. Her friend is an animated squirrel named Małgosia, with an alter ego named Teufel (German for "Devil").

The program is interrupted by interludes with statements from Agatka's mother, who is anonymous to the viewer. She explains her daughter's story and her inability to contact her, the result of a fact from the past that is incomprehensible to the viewer. Other episodic characters are girls—Karolina, Justynka and Hatshepsut from Bytom—and an adult man nicknamed "Dżinsowy Człowiek" (Jeans Man). The viewer learns about the plot through five full-fledged episodes, and short videos posted on the channel.

== Characteristics ==
The Poradnik Uśmiechu series is an example of a hauntologic story, stylized to look like VHS recordings from the 80s and 90s, while being a video creepypasta. The first episode was published on YouTube on 23 December 2013. Until the release of the end credits on 9 April 2017, the creators and actors were uncredited and unknown. For the duration of the series, the actors were not public figures.

The characters' and the project's social media language is inconsequential and chaotic and the visual side is psychedelic and unsettling. The episodes are interrupted with bits of American and Soviet educational footage from the 50s, 60s and 70s, with themes including nuclear physics, lifestyle, cooking and medicine.

During the three-and-a-half years of the project five episodes were released, with a third episode being swapped for a music video in the form of a different program Grzybowe Melodie (Mushroom Melodies), where the character Karolinka sings a song "Ballada w rytmie dżins" (A ballad in the rhythm of jeans). The author, whose voice was distorted intensively, performed the song.

The creator published a few pages of a book W Krainie Grzybów (In the Land of Mushrooms) by a fictional author, Zofia Kopytlanka, cited in the second and the fourth episode of Poradnik Uśmiechu; the entire work has never been published.

=== Smile Guide: The Apple Escape ===
The universe involves a free computer game in English: Smile Guide: The Apple Escape, published on itch.io on 24 August 2016, with Agatka as the main character. The game follows the specific, series' hauntological style. In the game, the player must collect 25 apples and bring them to the Agatka Prophecy Station.

=== Advertisement spot "Szczęście nóg nie liczy" ===
In 2014, during the time of the project, Wiktor Stribog created an advertisement for a Polish clothing brand Pan tu nie stał (You sir weren't standing there). Despite not having a plot related to Poradnik Uśmiechu, the ad Szczęście nóg nie liczy (Happiness doesn't count legs) is produced in the same style. The ad is credited to the fictional TV studio Kraina Grzybów TV in Warsaw at the end.

== Conception ==
The reason for creating the series was Wiktor Stribog's love for "work that disturbs, bends reality, plays with the recipient's predictions and destroys them". It resulted from his research interests (memes and virals), and his artistic explorations.

Kraina's concept was developed at the beginning of its creation, and its basic assumptions did not change throughout the project, even though every episode of Poradnik Uśmiechu was recorded in a different place.

Wiktor Stribog followed several rules including an attempt to generate nostalgic feelings and draw attention with interrupted sequences so his work would become a mind virus. He used his experience as a grad student and PhD candidate researching internet culture. He expected his work to gain traction, but was surprised when Kraina became known outside Poland.

From 23 December 2013 to 9 April 2017, neither the creator nor the series' purpose was known. Only in April 9th, 2017 did audience learn who the creator and the actors were when the final episode of Smile Guide came out. Despite this, the sense of the plot and the purpose are still ambiguous.

== Music ==
The music, composed by Wiktor Stribog, falls into genres—hauntology and vaporwave. Stribog was inspired by King Crimson, Brian Eno and Kraftwerk, among others. Mostly used as the soundtrack for Poradnik Uśmiechu, it was published on 19 January 2019 as Poradnik Uśmiechu OST digitally on YouTube, Spotify and bandcamp and as a limited release (200 discs) vinyl by Pan Tu Nie Stał on 7 June. The album version has slight differences from the music in the TV show.

=== Tracks ===
1. "Czas Pracy" - 4:48
2. "Zmartwienia" - 5:21
3. "Na Złej Drodze" - 5:03
4. "Ballada w Rytmie Dżins" - 3:27
5. "Nowe Przebudzenie" - 7:00
6. "Spóźniona Poczta" - 4:32
7. "To Tylko Taka Gra" - 4:20
8. "Czas Pożegnań" - 2:01
9. "Konfrontacja" - 4:03
10. "Słoneczna Ziemia" - 4:12
11. "Zimna Noc" - 1:42
12. "Przychodnia" - 1:58

== Reception and legacy ==
=== Popularity and fandom ===
The incomprehensibility of the message, its styling and characteristic music led to a rapid increase in the project's popularity and helped it attract an audience in the multi-millions, and a fandom that gathered in groups on Facebook and VK. There were accounts whose authors falsely claimed to be the creator of Poradnik Uśmiechu.

Stribog has a positive attitude towards Kraina Grzybów fans, and organized a Reddit AMA in April 2017 and created a fan group on Facebook—Wiktor Stribog & The People in February 2019.

=== Fan continuations ===
Many amateur artists, inspired by the style created by Wiktor Stribog, started to create their own versions and remakes of Kraina Grzybów, mainly on YouTube. The most popular fan-made channels include Kraina Grzybów II TV, Smith and, unrelated to the Kraina Grzybów universe, Magiczny Świat Ani, strongly influenced by Stribog's series. The series has also inspired numerous fan artists.

=== Interpretations ===
Poradnik Uśmiechu has provoked many interpretations and channels dedicated to explaining it—one of them being KrainaX, presenting a theory that Kraina Grzybów symbolised nuclear war, and an interpretation that Agatka was a child sexual abuse survivor. The accuracy of some of them spawned theories that their authors were connected to the creators of the original series, which Stribog denied. The author declined to explain the message of his work, and did not deem any theory correct.

=== Lectures, exhibitions, media ===
The first official meeting at which the subject of Kraina Grzybów was taken up was Co Kraina Grzybów?, in May 2017 held in the Museum of Modern Art, Warsaw. Episodes of Smile Guide were screened followed by a discussion between Wiktor Stribog and Dr. Magdalena Kamińska.

In May 2018, Wiktor Stribog took part in the festival Culminations, organizing a meeting with Kraina viewers moderated by Dr. Kamińska.

In the summer of 2018, an exhibition of Stribog's work titled Sny o byciu zjedzonym (Dreams of being eaten) took place at the Kronika Center of Modern Art in Bytom. One of the main elements was Poradnik Uśmiechu. The exhibition featured a figure of Agatka and screens on which all the episodes being played.

At the same time another meeting with Wiktor Stribog was held in the Museum of Modern Art, Warsaw as a part of Biuro Tekstów Jawnych. Fans could meet him in Cracow in July on meetYT in EXPO Kraków, a month later at the Octopus Film Festival, and in October at the Festiwal Fantastyki Falkon.

Kraina Grzybów and its creator was a subject of the cultural magazine Antyfonie on TVP Kultura—a TV theme channel. The episode aired on 11 March 2019.

== Cast ==
The actors were not selected by casting; they were close friends of Wiktor Stribog. They had covered eyes and distorted voices in the series, because the creator wanted to protect them from any unpredictable audience reactions. Despite this, the identities of the actress who played Agatka and Wiktor Stribog himself were discovered even before their official disclosure.

Cast
Actor	Character	Episode
Diana Klimowicz	Agatka	1-6
Anna Grudniewska (voice)	Małgosia AKA Teufel	1-6
Wiktor Stribog	Mom of Agatka (voice)	1-6
Łukasz Babula	Dżinsowy Człowiek (Jeans Man)	4,6
Magda Ładuniuk	Karolina	4,6
Agnieszka Piętka	Hatshepsut from Bytom	5
Diana Fict	Justynka	6

Smile Guide episodes
Number of episode	Name of episode (in Polish)	Released
1	Jak skutecznie jabłko	23 December 2013
2	Jak zrobić z papieru	23 February 2014
3	not released	none
4	Jak swoje włosy	18 September 2014
5	Jak poprawnie telefon	10 August 2015
6	Jak swoje dziecko	1 April 2017
