= Slashers =

Slashers can refer to:

- Slashers (film)
- Slashers (slamball team)
- Night Slashers, an arcade game
- Longford Slashers, a Gaelic football team
- Negros Slashers, a former professional basketball team
- Los Angeles Slashers, a Slamball team

== See also ==
- Slash (disambiguation)
- Slasher (disambiguation)
