= Samsung Slash =

Mobile phone model

The Samsung SPH-M310 Slash was a cell phone made by Samsung for prepaid customers on the Virgin Mobile network in the USA. The phone has a slider form factor and was released in 2008.

== Features ==
Other features include:

- 32MB of memory shared between pictures, applications, games and ring tones
- Bluetooth
- Full-color screen
- Mobile Web
- Speakerphone
- 499 contact entries
- Spanish-language user interface for Spanish-speaking customers
- Paid content portal called VirginXL to buy various user interface customizations
- Text messaging
- Voice dialing

== Reviews ==
Reaction to the phone differed. Info Sync World said the phone had "a low-end feel", giving it a score of 35%. CNet scored it 3/5 (meaning "good") and said "The Samsung Slash is a decent entry-level phone with a few extra features that put it just above a basic handset."
