= Otwock =

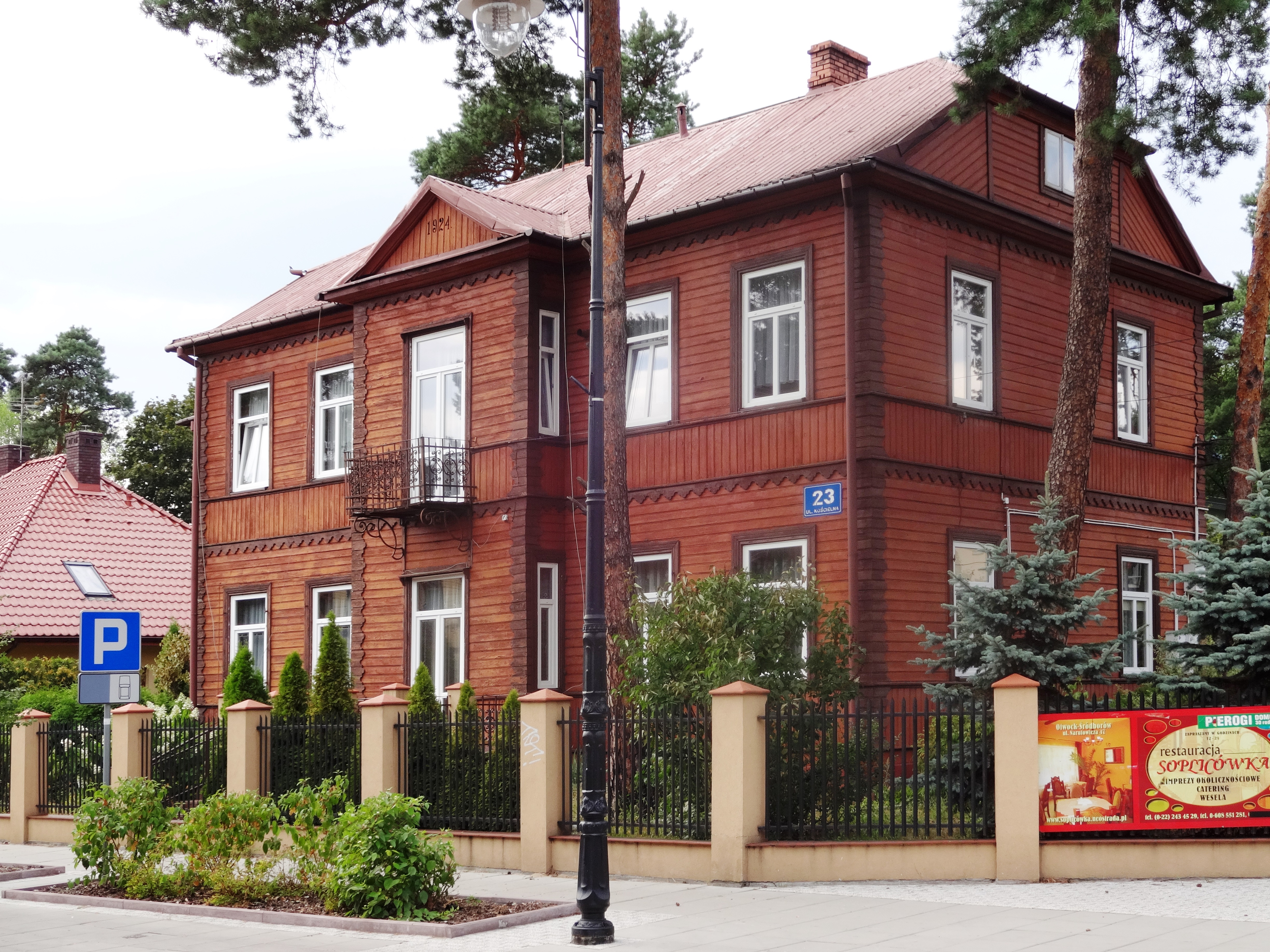
- Świdermajer-styled house in Otwock

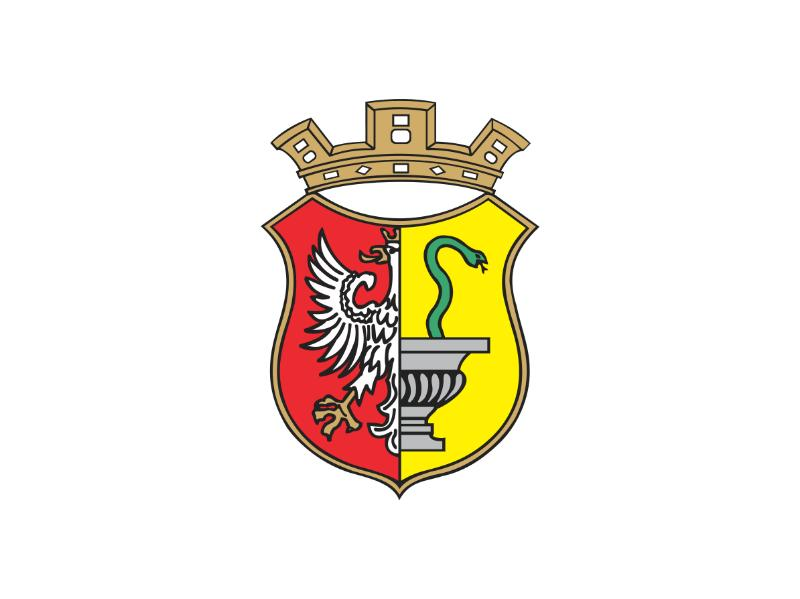
- Flag Coat of arms

- Location within Poland
- Coordinates: 52°7′N 21°16′E
- Country: Poland
- Voivodeship: Masovian
- County: Otwock
- Gmina: Otwock (urban gmina)
- Established: 1877
- City rights: 9 November 1916

Government
  - City mayor: Jarosław Margielski (PiS)

Area
  - Total: 47.33 km^{2} (18.27 sq mi)
- Elevation: 100 m (330 ft)

Population (2019)
  - Total: 44,635
  - Density: 943.1/km^{2} (2,443/sq mi)
- Time zone: UTC+1 (CET)
  - Summer (DST): UTC+2 (CEST)
- Postal code: 05-400 to 05-402
- Area code: +48 022
- Car plates: WOT
- Website: http://www.otwock.pl

Otwock ([ˈɔtfɔt͡sk]; Yiddish: אָטוואָצק) is a city in the Masovian Voivodeship in east-central Poland, some 23 kilometres (14 mi) south-east of Warsaw, with 43,895 inhabitants (2024). Otwock is part of the Warsaw metropolitan area. It is situated on the right bank of the Vistula River, below the mouth of the Świder River. Otwock is home to a unique architectural style called Świdermajer.

It is the capital of Otwock County. The town covers an area of 47 square kilometres (18 sq mi). Forested areas make up 23% of the territory, and there are several nature reserves.

== History ==
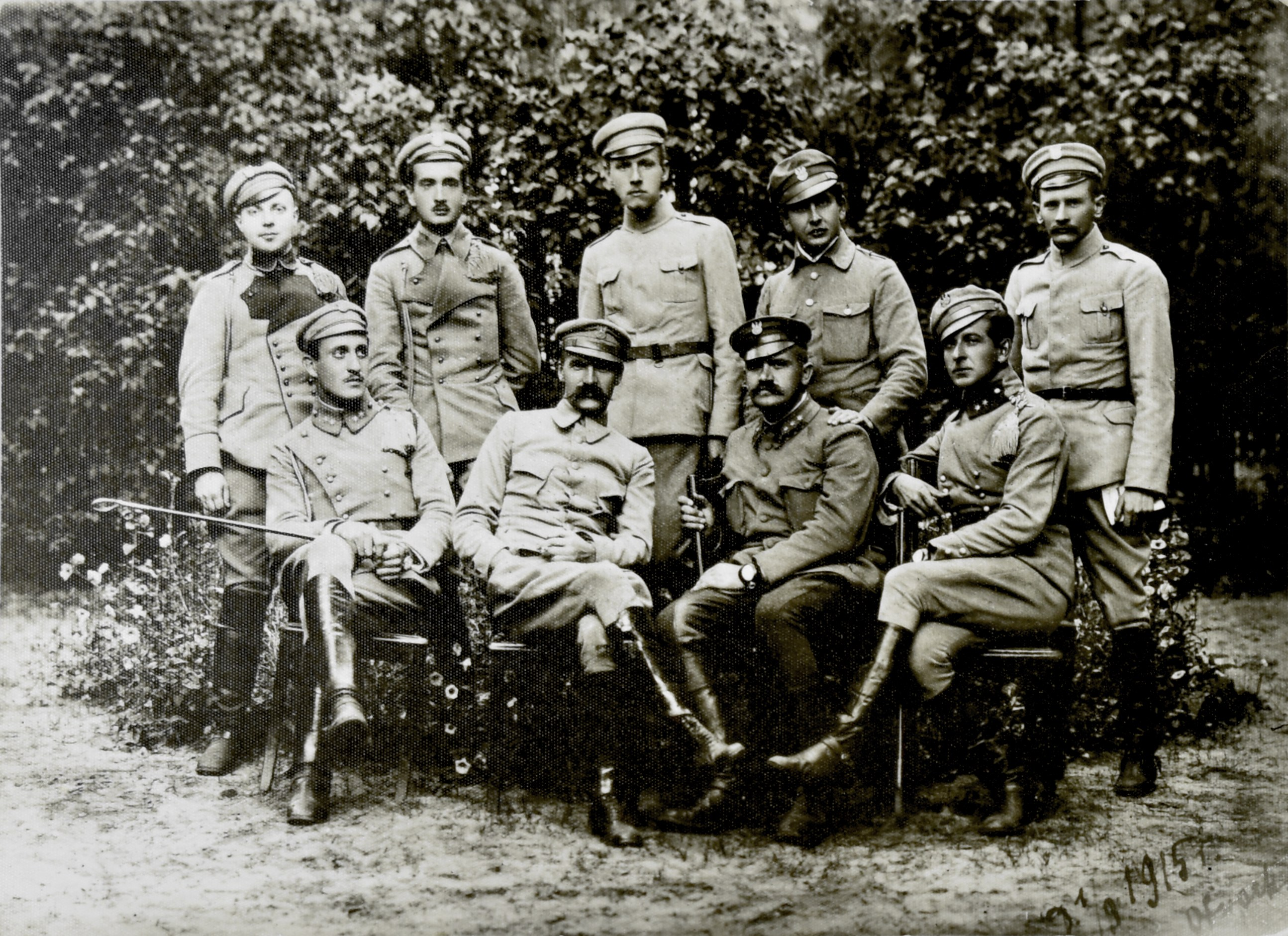
"The Commandant" Józef Piłsudski with his legionaries in Otwock in 1915

Even though the first mention of a village called Otwosko comes from the early 15th century, Otwock did not fully develop until the second half of the 19th century, when in 1877 the Vistula River Railroad was opened, which ran from Mława via Warsaw, to Lublin and Chełm. Otwock, which is located along the line, became a popular suburb, with numerous spas and several notable guests, including Józef Piłsudski and Władysław Reymont, who wrote his Nobel Prize-winning novel Chłopi there. The Zofiówka Sanatorium was opened in Otwock in 1908. In 1916, Otwock was incorporated as a town and became the seat of a powiat.

During the Battle of Warsaw (1920), Otwock, along with nearby Karczew, constituted the edge of the right wing of the first line of Polish defense and was manned by the Polish 15th Infantry Division, whereas the second line of Polish defense began in the present-day neighborhood of Świdry Wielkie; however, there was no Polish-Russian fighting in Otwock.

In 1936 the Warsaw - Otwock railway connection was the first rail line to be electrified in Poland.

=== World War II ===
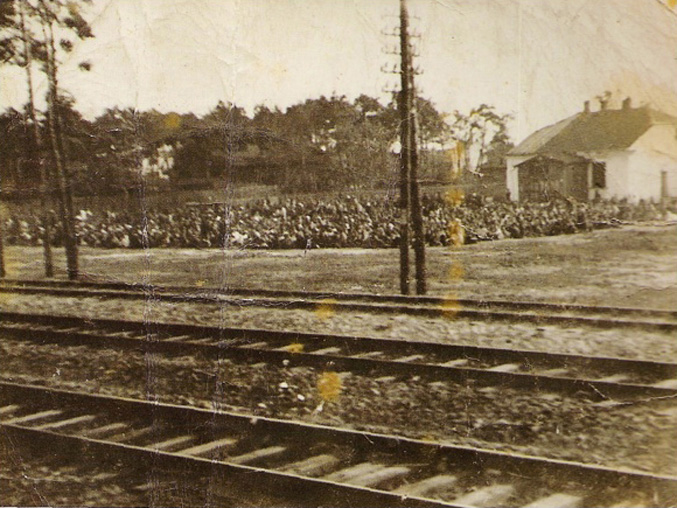
Layover yard in Otwock, 19 August 1942. In the distance, Jews sit on the ground overnight, while awaiting transport to Treblinka extermination camp. Clandestine photo

Following the German–Soviet invasion of Poland, which started World War II in September 1939, the town was occupied by Germany. In December 1939, the German authorities established a Jewish ghetto in Otwock. A murderous Action T4 euthanasia program was carried out by the Nazis in the local Zofiówka Sanatorium for the psychiatric patients in order to confine its Jewish population for the purpose of persecution and exploitation. The Ghetto was liquidated between August and 19 September 1942, when 75% of its Jewish population of 12,000–15,000 numbering at around 8,000 were assembled by the Nazis at a layover yard in Otwock (pictured) and transported in cattle trucks to extermination camps in Treblinka and Auschwitz. Jews who remained were summarily shot at Reymonta Street soon after.

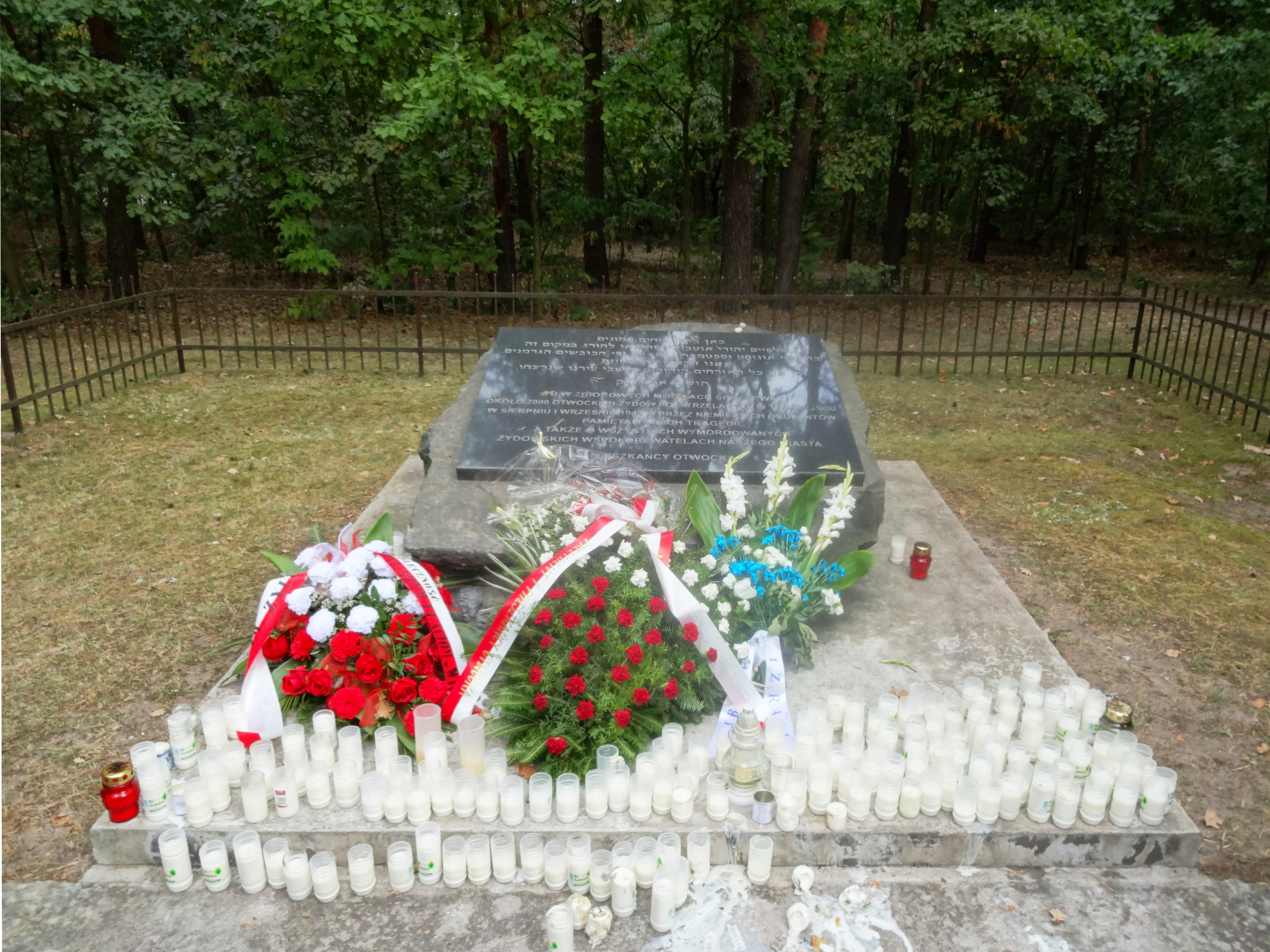
Memorial to Jews of Otwock who were murdered in the Holocaust

Otwock is the hometown of Irena Sendler (1910 – 2008), the Polish humanitarian who saved thousands of Jewish children during the Holocaust; as well as Krystyna Dańko, both awarded the titles of Righteous among the Nations by Yad Vashem. Writer Calel Perechodnik, a Jewish Ghetto Policeman from Otwock also hailed from this town. His memoir, Am I A Murderer? Testament Of A Jewish Ghetto Policeman, follows his personal experience as a ghetto policeman during the liquidation of the town, in which he chronicles the measures taken by both the Germans and the Jewish ghetto police in order to round up the Jewish populace for expulsion and extermination at Treblinka. Following the liberation, a children's home for Holocaust survivors was established in Otwock.

=== Life in the Ghetto ===
According to the memoir of Calel Perechodnik, a member of the Otwock ghetto police, many joined the force in early 1941 specifically to avoid being sent to forced labor camps, though they remained haunted by their role in eventual liquidation of their own families.

=== Post-war period ===
In 1952, the town's limits were expanded by including Świder, Świdry Wielkie, Teklin and Zamlądz as new neighbourhoods. Following the Korean War, in 1953–1959, Poland admitted 200 North Korean orphans in Świder.

From 1975 to 1998, it was administratively located in the Warsaw Voivodeship.

== Sights ==
In Otwock there are many buildings in the Świdermajer style, unique to the town and its surroundings. There are also memorials to Józef Piłsudski and to local Jews, who were murdered by Nazi Germany in the Holocaust.

The Mszar Pogorzelski, Świder and Wyspy Świderskie nature reserves are located in Otwock.

== Economy ==
In 1958, Ewa, the first Polish nuclear reactor was activated in Swierk district of Otwock. A second research reactor, Maria, was erected in 1974.

== Sports ==
Otwock is home to the sports club Start Otwock (founded in 1924). The club is renowned for its weight-lifters such as Szymon Kołecki and Marcin Dołęga.The club's own prodigy is football forward Janusz Żmijewski, who in the 1960s played for Legia Warszawa and the national team of Poland.

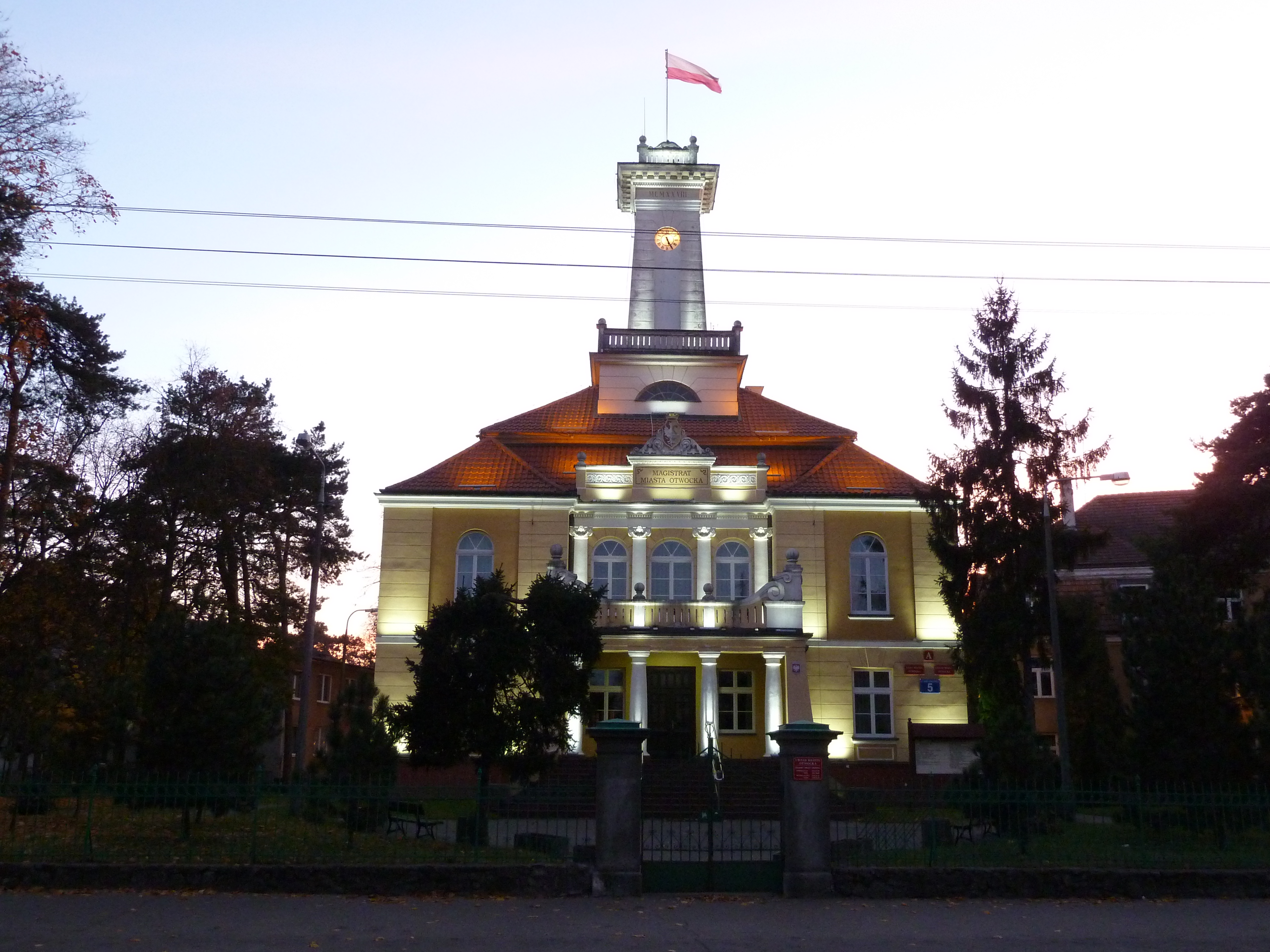
Town hall

== International relations ==
=== Twin towns – Sister cities ===
Otwock is twinned with:

- Lennestadt, Germany
- Saint-Amand-Montrond, France
- Ōarai, Ibaraki, Japan
- Shumsk, Ukraine
