= EXPO Kraków =

Exhibition centre in Kraków, Poland

- EXPO Kraków
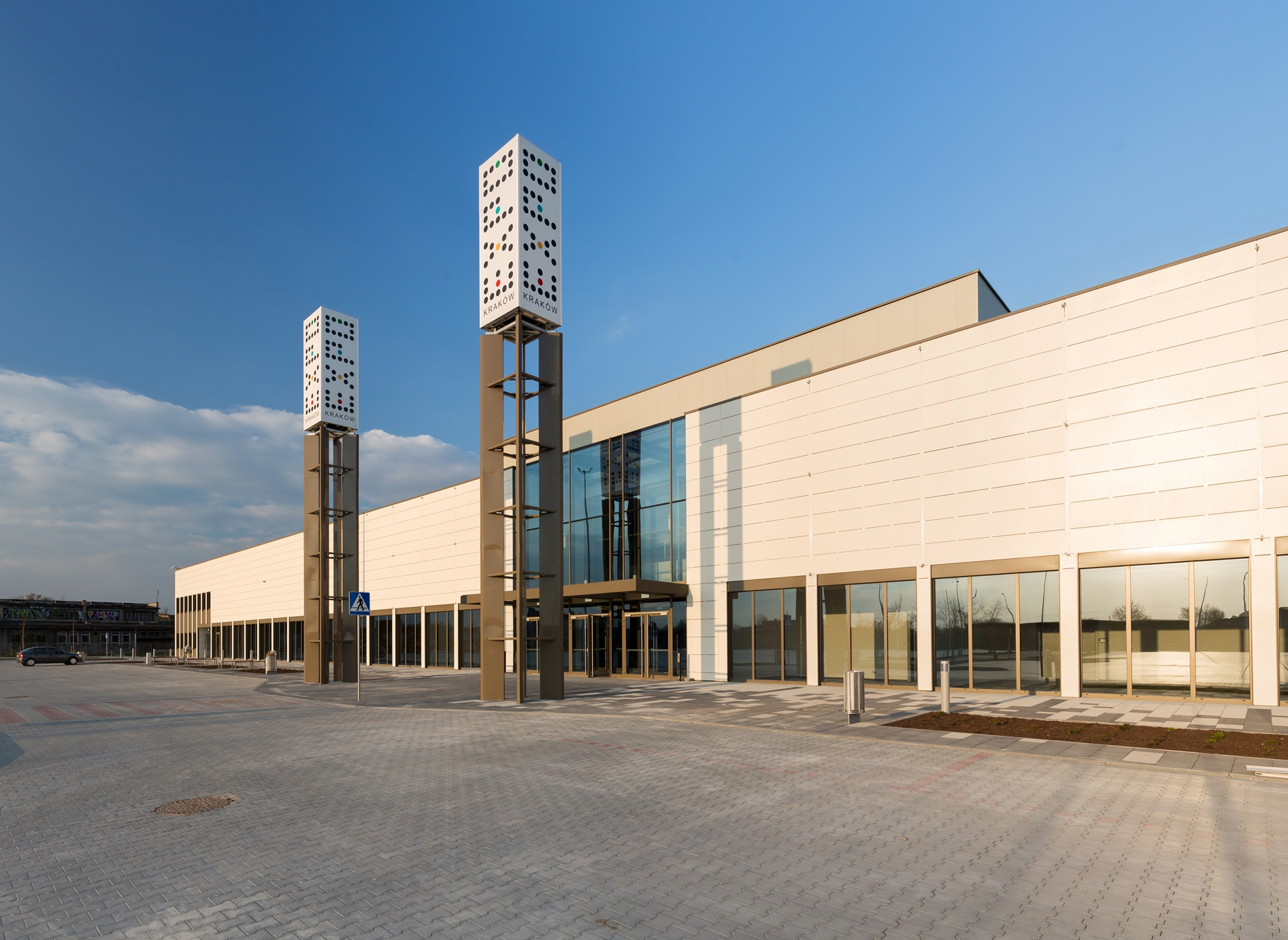
- Interactive map of the EXPO Kraków area

General information
- Location: Kraków, Poland, Galicyjska 9 Street
- Coordinates: 50°03′34.02″N 20°00′34.32″E
- Opened: 14 May 2014
- Owner: Targi w Krakowie

Technical details
- Floor area: 13 000 m2

Website
- http://expokrakow.com/

The International Exhibition and Convention Centre EXPO Kraków is an exhibition and convention centre located in Kraków, Poland. It is the largest multi-purpose facility in the south of the country. It is owned and operated by Targi w Krakowie. It was opened on 14 May 2014. EXPO Kraków is designed to accommodate trade fairs, congresses, concerts, banquets, product presentations, theatre performances, fashion shows and sports events. The building has a total usable surface area of 13,000 square metres (140,000 sq ft) including two 12-metre (39 ft) high halls with a total capacity of 9,000 square metres (97,000 sq ft) and 12 module conference rooms.

== Facilities ==
The International Exhibition and Convention Centre EXPO Kraków has an area of 7.2 hectares (18 acres). The total usable surface area of 13,000 square metres (140,000 sq ft) includes:

- Two exhibition halls with a total capacity of 9,000 square metres (97,000 sq ft) (Wisla hall – 5,000 square metres [54,000 sq ft], Dunaj hall – 4,000 square metres [43,000 sq ft]) and a load bearing capacity of 40 kPA
- 12 air-conditioned module conference rooms
- 4 meeting rooms
- Lobby
- Restaurant

EXPO Kraków is also the headquarters of Targi w Krakowie. The parking lot in front of the building can accommodate more than 700 cars.

== Events ==
Many events have been organised at EXPO Kraków. Among those organised by Targi w Krakowie are:

- International Dental Trade Fair in Kraków
- MOTO SHOW Kraków
- Trade Fair of Mobile Solutions and Technologies Mobile-IT
- International Trade Fair of Industrial Insulation
- Winter Tourism Trade Fair
- Skiing Stations and Winter Resorts Equipment
- International Sheet Metal Working, Joining and Coating Fair
- International Trade Fair of Machine Tools, Tools, Devices and Equipment for Material Processing
- International Book Fair in Kraków
- International Trade Fair of Hotel and Catering Equipment
- Food and Drinks for Catering Trade Fair
- International Wine Trade Fair in Kraków
