= Slasher (2007 film) =

- DVD released by Unearthed Films
- Directed by: Frank W. Montag
- Screenplay by: Jörn Döring; Frank W. Montag
- Story by: Jörn Döring; Frank W. Montag
- Produced by: Frank W. Montag; Thomas Kercmar
- Starring: Pia de Buhr; Heiko Lange; Christian Stock; Maja Makowski; Christiane Imdahl; Michael Eisenburger; Sebastian Badenberg
- Cinematography: Andreas Jahn
- Edited by: Frank W. Montag
- Music by: Timo Rose; Frank W. Montag
- Production company: Mondaymovies
- Distributed by: Unearthed Films
- Release date: April 27, 2007 (Weekend of Fear Festival)
- Running time: 80 minutes
- Country: Germany
- Language: German
- Budget: €10,000

Slasher is a 2007 German slasher film written and directed by Frank W. Montag, and co-written by Jörn Döring.

== Plot ==
After opening with a picnicking couple being murdered by a disfigured man in the woods, the film shows Erin in a college psychology class, where a lecturer mentions Mike Corman, a local serial killer who murdered at least four girls. Mike's crimes were discovered when his house caught fire, though Mike himself was never found. As Erin, her boyfriend Danny, and their friends (Julie, Chris, Tom, and Maya) head to a campsite where they will spend their school break, the deformed man (revealed to be Mike) butchers another couple at a lake.

Getting lost on the way to the campgrounds, the students are given directions by a leprous and lecherous farmer, and reach their destination. That night, the farmer's son peeps on Tom and Maya having sex in their tent, and is killed by Mike (who has adorned a white mask one of the students had brought along). The next day, Mike murders the farmer's daughter and captures Tom and Maya when they find his cabin. Tom has his head crushed in a vise, and Maya is tortured. When Tom and Maya do not return after several hours, Erin becomes worried and goes looking for them with Danny. When those two leave, the camp generator stops working, and Chris is knifed when he goes to see what is wrong with it. After Erin and Danny discover the remains of some of Mike's earlier victims, Danny is axed by Mike, and Erin is punched out by Julie.

Erin awakens in the cabin, and is taunted by Julie, who is Mike's older sister and lover. It is revealed that Erin had previously encountered Mike, and was the one who set the fire that caused his disfigurement and brain damage. Erin escapes her shackles and runs outside, followed by Julie, who catches up with Erin at a stream. Julie tries to drown Erin, but is killed when Erin bludgeons her with a discarded pipe. Erin returns to the campsite, finds the wounded Danny there, and tries to drive away with him, only for the car to run out of gas. Mike appears, and he chases Erin through the woods. Erin reaches the farmhouse, and tries to get help from the farmer, but he is drunk and tries to rape her. Mike impales the farmer with a chainsaw, which runs out of gas, so he attacks Erin with a knife, and drags her into the barn. As Mike strangles Erin, she grabs a pair of pruning shears, gouges out one of his eyes, and jams her thumb into the wound. The incapacitated Mike is stabbed repeatedly by Erin, who ties a rope around his neck, attaches the other end to a tractor, and drives the vehicle until Mike's neck snaps.

Erin stumbles outside, and discovers Danny, who is barely alive. The two reach help, and while in the back of an ambulance, Erin has a series of flashbacks which indicate she was the one who tortured and killed the four girls that Mike was thought to have murdered. Erin suffocates Danny, exits the ambulance, and walks away grinning madly.

== Cast ==
- Christiane Imdahl as Erin McKenzie
- Christian Stock as Danny
- Pia de Buhr as Julie Corman
- Sebastian Badenberg as Mike Corman
- Michael Eisenburger as Chris
- Heiko Lange as Tom
- Maja Makowski as Maya
- Peter Herff as Farmer
- Hannah Kobitzsch as Farmer's Daughter
- Andreas Jahn as Farmer's Son
- Vivien Walter as Professor
- Katrin Huß as Victim #1
- Thomas Kercmar as Wolbort the Butcher
- Vanessa Radenberg as Victim #2
- Patrick Dewayne as Victim #3
- Nadine Beuche as Victim #4
- Yvonne Beuche as Victim #5
- Maya Henselek as Victim #6
- Meelah Adams as Lea
- Patrick Battenberg as Alex
- Hans Christian Hanrath as Cashier
- Stephanie Jost as Maya's Friend
- Nora Krehan as Wolbort's Wife
- Anna Woycek as Tom's Friend

== Reception ==
A score of two out of five was awarded by Moria, which wrote that Slasher was amateurish, derivative, and unimaginative with bland characters and a preposterous twist ending. Everything about the film was criticized by Slasherpool, which gave it a zero. Wildside Cinema said Slasher is "an unimaginatively titled, unimaginatively written, poorly directed, low-budget horror film from Germany that, in my opinion, didn't even rise to the worst German splatter films" and "The cons are incredibly numerous here including days that run into nights in seconds, non-stop music, bad writing, color saturation issues and more".

Despite deeming it clichéd in every regard, Oh, the Horror! stated Slasher was competent and "a decent, bloody time-waster for fans of this particular genre". Film Bizarro also found the film watchable, despite listing a number of problems such as bad editing and acting, no atmosphere or suspense, restrained gore, erratic pacing, and a lack of originality.
