= Slasher (basketball) =

Type of basketball player

A slasher is a basketball player who primarily drives (slashes) to the basket when on offense. They are typically a guard, but can also be a forward. A slasher is a fast and athletic player who attempts to get close to the basket for a layup, dunk or teardrop shot. This style of high-percentage two-point play is commonly referred to as slashing.

Slashers usually take more free-throw shots than other players due to the increased amount of contact made on them as they constantly and aggressively run towards the basket. Many different kinds of slashers gain extra free-throws by "drawing fouls", which is deliberately causing contact with a defending player. They may spend many hours working on increasing their free-throw percentage.

Many players who begin as slashers typically develop their game (especially their jump shot), as age and injuries occur, which may prevent them from being as effective as a slasher (for example, Michael Jordan and Kobe Bryant both developed a fadeaway jump shot as they got older).

== Examples of slashers ==
- Giannis Antetokounmpo
- Elgin Baylor
- RJ Barrett
- Jaylen Brown
- Kobe Bryant
- Jimmy Butler
- Vince Carter
- DeMar DeRozan
- Goran Dragic
- Clyde Drexler
- Kevin Durant
- Anthony Edwards
- Monta Ellis
- Julius Erving
- Paul George
- George Gervin
- Shai Gilgeous-Alexander
- Manu Ginóbili
- Penny Hardaway
- James Harden
- Grant Hill
- Kyrie Irving
- Allen Iverson
- LeBron James
- Eddie Johnson
- Magic Johnson
- Michael Jordan
- Zach LaVine
- Kawhi Leonard
- Damian Lillard
- John Lucas
- Pete Maravich
- Kevin Martin
- Tracy McGrady
- Donovan Mitchell
- Earl Monroe
- Ja Morant
- Calvin Murphy
- Victor Oladipo
- Tony Parker
- Paul Pierce
- Scottie Pippen
- Guy Rodgers
- Rajon Rondo
- Derrick Rose
- Brandon Roy
- Ben Simmons
- Jerry Stackhouse
- Dwyane Wade
- John Wall
- Russell Westbrook
- Dominique Wilkins
