= Research reactor =

Nuclear device not intended for power or weapons

Research reactors are nuclear fission-based nuclear reactors that serve primarily as a neutron source. They are also called non-power reactors, in contrast to power reactors that are used for electricity production, heat generation, or maritime propulsion.

== Purpose ==
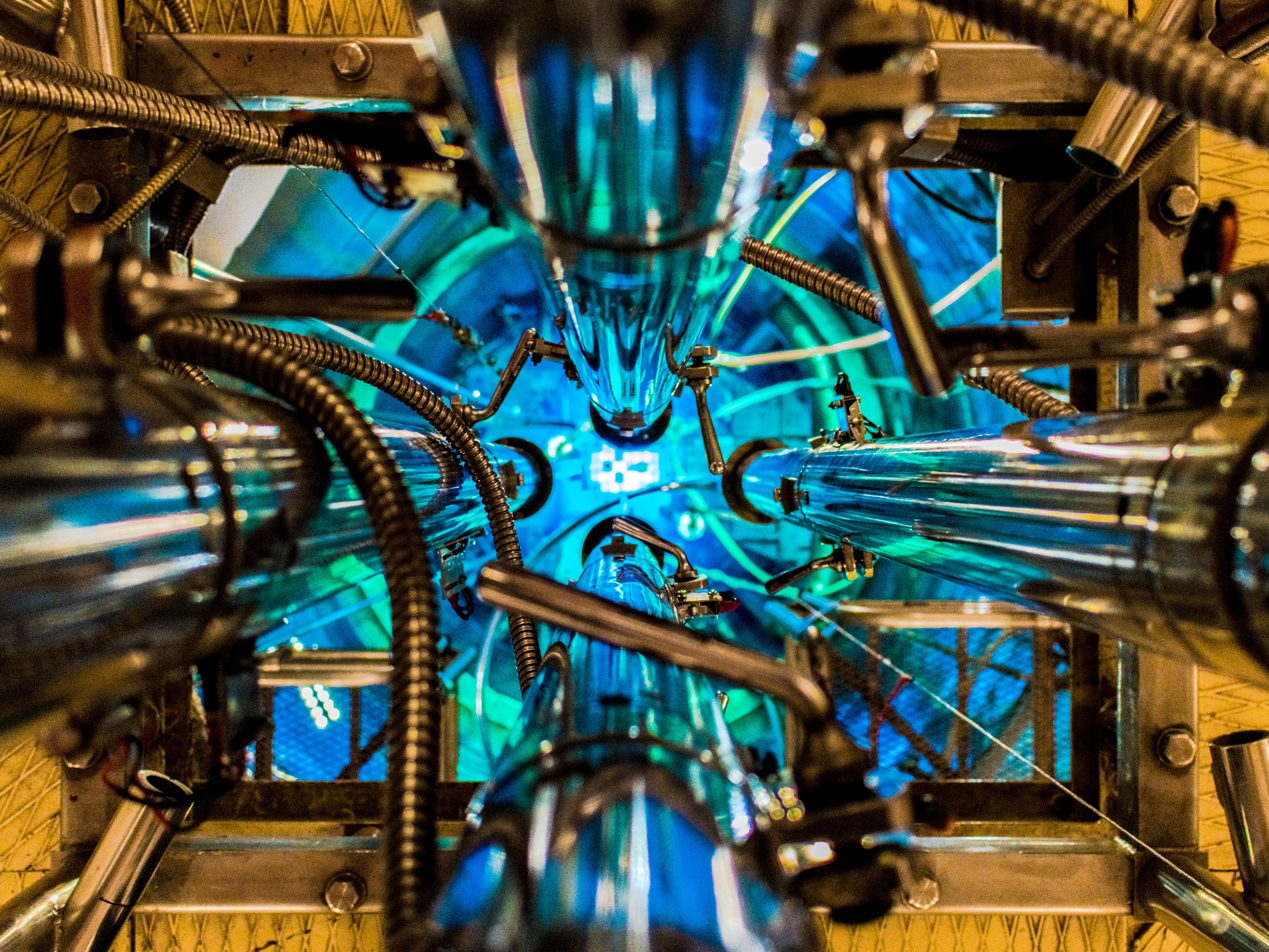
Overhead view of the core of the RA-3 Research and Production Reactor (CNEA, Argentina)

The neutrons produced by a research reactor are used for neutron scattering, non-destructive testing, analysis and testing of materials, production of radioisotopes, research and public outreach and education. Research reactors that produce radioisotopes for medical or industrial use are sometimes called isotope reactors. Reactors that are optimised for beamline experiments nowadays compete with spallation sources.

== Technical aspects ==
Research reactors are simpler than power reactors and operate at lower temperatures. They need far less fuel, and far less fission products build up as the fuel is used. On the other hand, their fuel requires more highly enriched uranium, typically up to 20% U-235, although some use 93% U-235; while 20% enrichment is not generally considered usable in nuclear weapons, 93% is commonly referred to as "weapons-grade". They also have a very high power density in the core, which requires special design features. Like power reactors, the core needs cooling, typically natural or forced convection with water, and a moderator is required to slow the neutron velocities and enhance fission. As neutron production is their main function, most research reactors benefit from reflectors to reduce neutron loss from the core.

== Conversion to low enriched uranium ==
The International Atomic Energy Agency and the U.S. Department of Energy initiated a program in 1978 to develop the means to convert research reactors from using highly enriched uranium (HEU) to the use of low enriched uranium (LEU), in support of its nonproliferation policy. By that time, the U.S. had supplied research reactors and highly enriched uranium to 41 countries as part of its Atoms for Peace program. In 2004, the U.S. Department of Energy extended its Foreign Research Reactor Spent Nuclear Fuel Acceptance program until 2019.

As of 2016, a National Academies of Sciences, Engineering, and Medicine report concluded converting all research reactors to LEU cannot be completed until 2035 at the earliest. In part this is because the development of reliable LEU fuel for high neutron flux research reactors, that does not fail through swelling, has been slower than expected. As of 2020, 72 HEU research reactors remain.

== Designers and constructors ==
While in the 1950s, 1960s and 1970s there were a number of companies that specialized in the design and construction of research reactors, the activity of this market cooled down afterwards, and many companies withdrew.

The market has consolidated today into a few companies that concentrate the key projects on a worldwide basis.

The most recent international tender (1999) for a research reactor was that organized by the Australian Nuclear Science and Technology Organisation for the design, construction and commissioning of the Open-pool Australian lightwater reactor (OPAL). Four companies were prequalified: Atomic Energy of Canada Limited (AECL), INVAP, Siemens and Technicatom. The project was awarded to INVAP that built the reactor. In recent years, AECL withdrew from this market, and Siemens and Technicatom activities were merged into Areva.

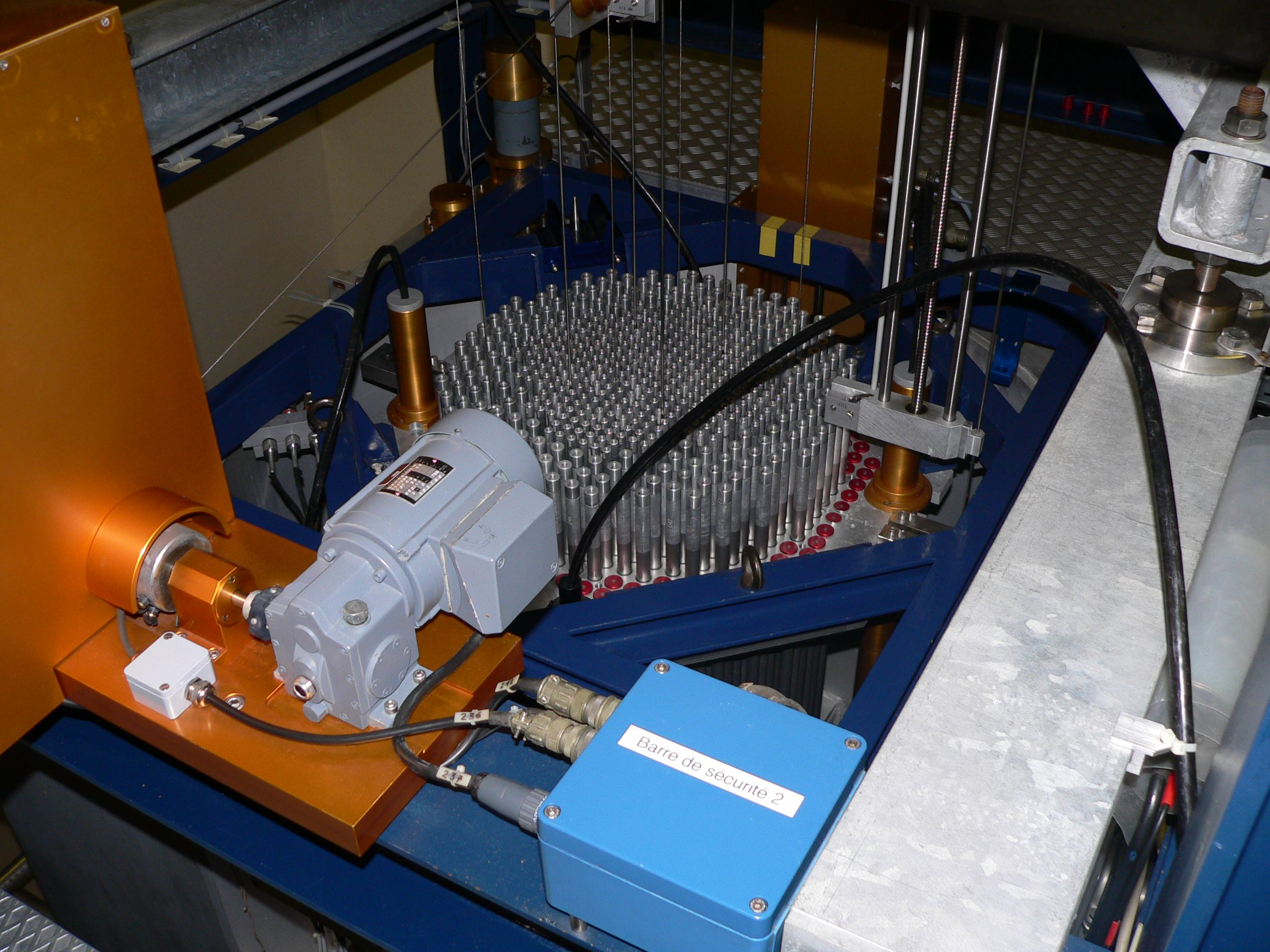
The CROCUS research reactor of the École polytechnique fédérale de Lausanne, in Switzerland

== Classes of research reactors ==
- Aqueous homogeneous reactor
- Argonaut class reactor
- DIDO class, six high-flux reactors worldwide
- TRIGA, a highly successful class with >50 installations worldwide
- SLOWPOKE reactor class, developed by AECL, Canada
- OPAL reactor class, developed by INVAP, Argentina
- Miniature neutron source reactor, based on the SLOWPOKE design, developed by AECL, currently exported by China
- Aerojet General Nucleonics, 201 Models. Developed by Aerojet General in the United States. Three current reactors in operation at Idaho State University, The University of New Mexico, and Texas A&M University.

== Research centers ==
A complete list can be found at the List of nuclear research reactors.

Research centers that operate a reactor:

Reactor Name	Country	City	Institution	Power Level	Operation Date
BR2 Reactor	Belgium	Mol	Belgian Nuclear Research Center SCK•CEN	100 MW	
Budapest Research Reactor	Hungary	Budapest	Hungarian Academy of Sciences Centre for Energy Research	5 MW	1959
Budapest University of Technology Training Reactor	Hungary	Budapest	Budapest University of Technology and Economics	100 kW	1969
ILL High-Flux Reactor	France	Grenoble	Institut Laue-Langevin	63 MW	
RA-6	Argentina	Bariloche	Balseiro Institute / Bariloche Atomic Centre	1 MW	1982
ZED-2	Canada	Deep River, Ontario	AECL's Chalk River Laboratories	200 W	1960
McMaster Nuclear Reactor	Canada	Hamilton, Ontario	McMaster University	5 MW	1959
UF Training Reactor	United States	Gainesville, Florida	University of Florida	100 kW	1959
National Research Universal reactor	Canada	Deep River, Ontario	AECL's Chalk River Laboratories	135 MW	1957
Petten nuclear reactors	Netherlands	Petten	Dutch Nuclear Research and consultancy Group, EU Joint Research Centre	30 kW and 60MW	1960
ORPHEE	France	Saclay	Laboratoire Léon Brillouin	14 MW	1980
FRM II	Germany	Garching	Technical University of Munich	20 MW	2004
HOR	Netherlands	Delft	Reactor Institute Delft, Delft University of Technology	2 MW	
Mainz	Germany	Mainz	Universität Mainz, Institut für Kernchemie	100 kW	
TRIGA Mark II	Austria	Vienna	Technical University Vienna, TU Wien, Atominstitut	250 kW	1962
IRT-2000	Bulgaria	Sofia	Bulgarian Academy of Sciences research site	2 MW	
OPAL	Australia	Lucas Heights, New South Wales	Australian Nuclear Science and Technology Organisation	20 MW	2006
IEA-R1	Brazil	São Paulo	Instituto de Pesquisas Energéticas e Nucleares	3.5 MW	1957
IRT-2000	Russia	Moscow	Moscow Engineering Physics Institute	2.5 MW	1967
SAFARI-1	South Africa	Pelindaba	South African Nuclear Energy Corporation	20 MW	1965
PARR-l	Pakistan	Islamabad	Pakistan Institute of Nuclear Science & Technology	5 MW	1965
PARR-ll	Pakistan	Islamabad	Pakistan Institute of Nuclear Science & Technology	30 KW	1989
High-Flux Advanced Neutron Application Reactor	South Korea	Daejeon	Korea Atomic Energy Research Institute	30 MW	1995
LVR-15	Czech Republic	Řež	Nuclear Research Institute	10 MW	1995
North Carolina State University Reactor Program	United States	Raleigh, North Carolina	North Carolina State University	1 MW	1953
High Flux Isotope Reactor	United States	Oak Ridge, Tennessee	Oak Ridge National Laboratory		
Advanced Test Reactor	United States	Idaho	Idaho National Laboratory	250 MW	
University of Missouri Research Reactor	United States	Columbia, Missouri	University of Missouri	10 MW	1966
Maryland University Training Reactor	United States	College Park, Maryland	University of Maryland	250 kW	1970
Washington State University Reactor	United States	Pullman, Washington	Washington State University	1 MW	
CROCUS	Switzerland	Lausanne	École polytechnique fédérale de Lausanne		
Maria reactor	Poland	Świerk-Otwock	National Centre for Nuclear Research	30 MW	1974
TRIGA Mark I	United States	Irvine, California	University of California, Irvine		
ITU TRIGA Mark-II Training and Research Reactor	Turkey	Istanbul	Istanbul Technical University		
ETRR-1	Egypt	Inshas	Nuclear Research Center	2 MW	1961
ETRR-2	Egypt	Inshas	Nuclear Research Center	22 MW	1997
Ghana Research Reactor-1	Ghana	Accra	National Nuclear Research Institute of the Ghanan Atomic Energy Commission	30 kW	

Decommissioned research reactors:

Reactor Name	Country	City	Institution	Power Level	Operation Date	Closure Date	Decommissioned
ASTRA	Austria	Seibersdorf	Austrian Institute of Technology	10 MW	1960	1999	
BER II	Germany	Berlin	Helmholtz-Zentrum Berlin	10 MW	1973	2019	
CONSORT	United Kingdom	Ascot, Berkshire	Imperial College	100 kW	1965	2012	
JASON reactor	United Kingdom	Greenwich	Royal Naval College	10 kW	1962	1996	
MOATA	Australia	Lucas Heights	Australian Atomic Energy Commission	100 kW	1961	1995	
High Flux Australian Reactor	Australia	Lucas Heights	Australian Atomic Energy Commission		1958	2007	
HTGR (Pin-in-Block Design)	United Kingdom	Winfrith, Dorset	International Atomic Energy Agency	20MWt	1964	1976	July 2005
DIDO	United Kingdom	Harwell, Oxfordshire	Atomic Energy Research Establishment			1990	
Nuclear Power Demonstration	Canada	Deep River, Ontario	AECL's Rolphton plant	20 MW	1961	1987	
NRX	Canada	Deep River, Ontario	AECL's Chalk River Laboratories		1952	1992	
PLUTO reactor	United Kingdom	Harwell, Oxfordshire	Atomic Energy Research Establishment	26 MW	1957	1990	
Pool Test Reactor	Canada	Deep River, Ontario	AECL's Chalk River Laboratories	10 kW	1957	1990	
WR-1	Canada	Pinawa, Manitoba	AECL's Whiteshell Laboratories	60 MW	1965	1985	
ZEEP	Canada	Deep River, Ontario	AECL's Chalk River Laboratories		1945	1973	
More Hall Annex	United States	Seattle	University of Washington	100 kW	1961	1988	
Ewa reactor	Poland	Świerk-Otwock	POLATOM Institute of Nuclear Energy	10 MW	1958	1995	
FiR 1	Finland	Espoo	Helsinki University of Technology, later VTT Technical Research Centre of Finland	250 kW	1962	2015	
RV-1	Venezuela	Caracas	Venezuelan Institute for Scientific Research	3 MW	1960	1994	
Salaspils Research Reactor	Latvia	Salaspils	Latvian Academy of Sciences	2 kW	1961	1998	
