= Universities Research Reactor =

English nuclear research reactor

Coordinates: 53°25′38″N 2°31′53″W

Universities Research Reactor, also known as Universities' Research Reactor or University Research Reactor, was a small Argonaut class nuclear research reactor in Risley, Warrington, England that went critical on 7 July 1964. It was jointly owned and operated by Manchester and Liverpool universities and used for performing neutron activation work and training reactor operators.

== Design ==
The reactor used highly enriched uranium metal fuel clad in aluminium. The fuel elements consisted of bundles of flat plates rather than rods. The core was cooled by light water.

The fuel elements were situated within six open-topped aluminium tanks containing water that were separated and surrounded by graphite. This meant that moderation was part by the water within the tanks and part by graphite - with graphite serving as the reflector.

Reactivity control was provided by four semaphore signal–type control blades held by magnetic clutches to shafts that could be driven by geared electric motors. The blades were made of cadmium plates riveted to aluminium blades. The insertion of a single blade was sufficient to shut down the fission chain reaction.

The simple control system did not use voting logic. Any detected fault resulted in an immediate scram. Power failure also produced an immediate scram as the magnetic clutches on the control blades would disengage, certain control instrumentation had battery back up support.

The heat generated by fission was carried away by the cooling water and disposed of outside the facility by means of a forced-draft cooling radiator. Due to the small size of the core and low burn up of the fuel, the disposal of fission product heating was not an issue.

The concrete shielding was penetrated by a number of holes enabling neutron beams to be obtained for the purpose of irradiating samples and several pipes that enabled samples in sample carriers to be inserted into the reactor and subsequently removed to the adjoining radiochemical laboratory for study.

== Operations ==
The construction works started in 1962 and went critical on 7 July 1964.

In later years the reactor was rated at 300 kW thermal however originally the output was 100 kW thermal.

A study was undertaken (around 1980) to investigate increasing the power to 1 MW thermal; however, this was deemed to be too difficult and the plans were abandoned.

== Decommissioning ==
Decommissioning work began in 1992 and was finished in 2006. The reactor fuel being reprocessed. The nuclear waste produced during the dismantling operations was moved to Sellafield for permanent storage.
