= Latvian Environment, Geology and Meteorology Centre =

Research centre in Latvia

LVĢMC logo

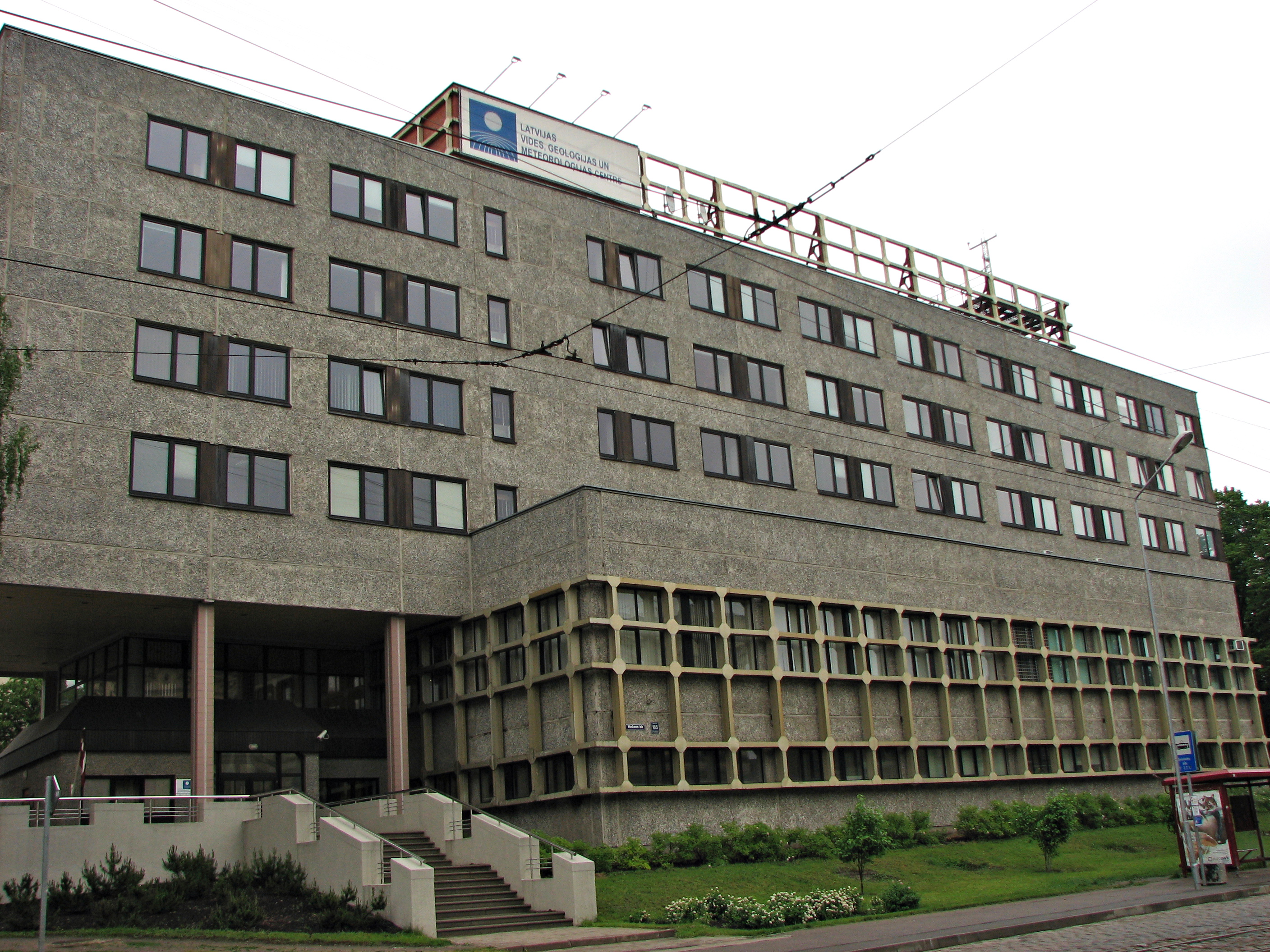
Latvian Environment, Geology and Meteorology Centre

The Latvian Environment, Geology and Meteorology Centre (Latvian: Latvijas Vides, ģeoloģijas un meteoroloģijas centrs; LVĢMC) is a governmental service under the Ministry of Environmental Protection and Regional Development of Latvia.

The main objectives of the center are to collect and process environmental information, carry out environmental monitoring and inform the society on the environmental situation, as well as, ensure the geologic supervision and rational use of natural resources and realize state policies in the spheres of geology, meteorology, climatology, hydrology, air quality, and cross-border air pollution influence.

== History ==
In February 1989 The Republican Ecology Research and Information Center was created by Decree No.4 of the State Environment Protection Committee order of the Latvian SSR of 1 January 1989, on the basis of the Central Hydrochemical laboratory of the Ministry of Melioration and Water Management of the Latvian SSR. In September 1993, the Latvian Environmental Data Center was created by Decree No.9 of the Ministry of Environment and Regional Development of Latvia of 17 September 1993. On 1 October 2000, the Latvian Environmental Agency was created by Decree N0.478 of the Cabinet of Ministers of Latvia of 27 September 2000, reorganizing the Environmental Consultation and Monitoring Center and merging it with the Latvian Environmental Data Center. In 2000 by Decree of the Minister of Environment and Regional Development of 6 August 2001, the Latvian Environmental Agency adopted the National Surface Water Monitoring Program for implementation from the Latvian Hydrometeorology Agency.

== Functions ==
The LEGMC has the following functions:

- to carry out functions defined in the normative acts as well as tasks set by the state administration in accordance with a purpose of establishment of the company;
- to create and develop a united environment information system;
- to assist in improving the national environmental monitoring and indicator system;
- to carry out environmental, geological, hydrological, meteorological observations and provide corresponding results within frameworks of international, national, and regional projects and programs; to ensure collection, storage, systematization and supplementation of geological, hydrological and meteorological data along with data of environmental quality;
- to evaluate environmental quality, condition of natural resources, tendencies, forecasts and risk factors and to prepare national environmental reports and statements;
- according to its competence, to provide environmental, geological, hydrological, and meteorological information to the society, state and municipal institutions as well as to European Union institutions and international organizations;
- to elaborate weather, hydrological and other specialized forecasts;
- to ensure provision of information necessary for aeronavigation;
- to ensure evaluation of mineral resources in the territory of Latvia;
- to manage the Latvian State Geologic Fund and the borehole core and standard sample storage;
- to carry out functions of a meteorological institution in accordance with the Convention on International Civil Aviation of 7 December 1944; to ensure fulfillment of other international obligations of the Republic of Latvia in relation to spheres of LEGMC's activities;
- to represent the Republic of Latvia in the World Meteorological Organization as well as in other international organizations whose activities are related to meteorology, hydrology, geology, assessment of environmental quality, supervision of chemical substances and management of hazardous and radioactive waste; to act as the European Environment Agency coordination centre and the national competent authority of management of chemical substances in the Republic of Latvia; according to LEGMC's spheres of activities, to represent the Republic of Latvia in European Commission working groups;
- to inform of dangerous meteorological and hydrological phenomena as well as phenomena related to changes in environmental quality that may cause catastrophes, destruction, and accidents;
- to supply authorities that are responsible for civil defense with information for artesian well protection measure planning and provision of water supply in case of a state threat;
- to ensure management of radioactive waste, to manage the Radioactive Waste Disposal Site "Radons", the Salaspils Research Reactor, state owned objects of hazardous waste recycling, hazardous waste incineration equipment, hazardous waste polygons along with other state owned objects and equipment related * to management of hazardous waste;
- to test radioactive materials and ionizing radiation sources in LEGMC managed facilities;
- to decontaminate contaminated territories, vehicles and other objects after radioactivity accidents;
- to carry out the dismantling and disposal of the Salaspils Research Reactor.

=== Centre activity areas ===
- Water Management
- Measurement equipment calibration
- Environment Sample Testing
- Geology
- Ozone layer protection
- Observations and monitoring
