= Hydrophone =

Underwater microphone

A hydrophone (Ancient Greek: ὕδωρ + φωνή, lit. 'water + sound') is a microphone designed for underwater use, for recording or listening to underwater sound. Most hydrophones contain a piezoelectric transducer that generates an electric potential when subjected to a pressure change, such as a sound wave.

A hydrophone can also detect airborne sounds but is insensitive of them because it is designed to match the acoustic impedance of water, a denser fluid than air. Sound travels 4.3 times faster in water than in air, and a sound wave in water exerts a pressure 60 times more than what is exerted by a wave of the same amplitude in air. Similarly, a standard microphone can be buried in the ground, or immersed in water if it is put in a waterproof container but will give poor performance because of the similarly-bad acoustic impedance match.

== History ==
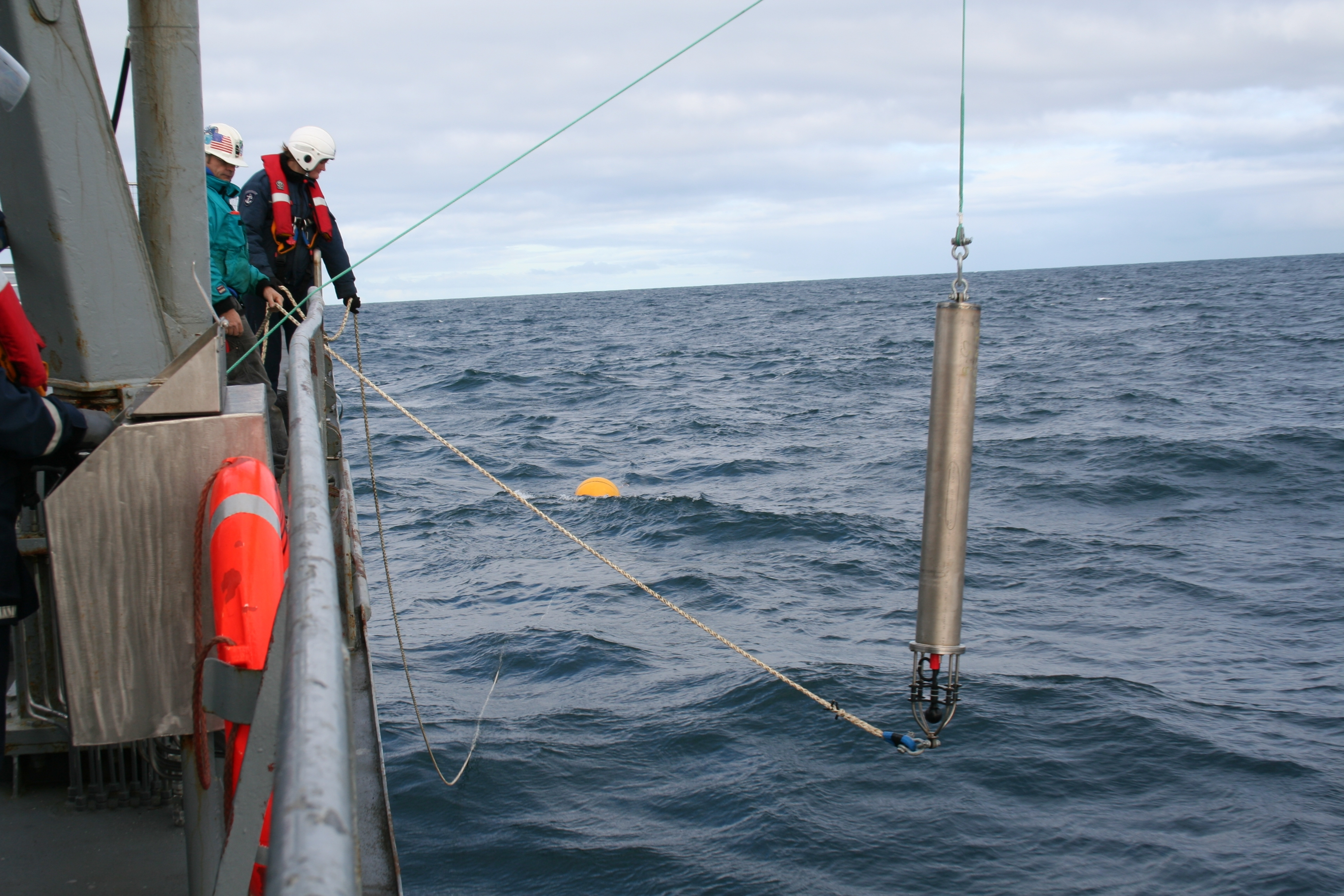
A hydrophone being lowered into the North Atlantic

The first hydrophones consisted of a tube with a thin membrane covering the submerged end and the observer's ear of the equipment. The design of effective hydrophones must take into account the acoustic resistance of water, which is 3750 times that of air, and so the pressure exerted by a wave of the same intensity in air is increased by a factor of 3750 in water. The American Submarine Signaling Company developed a hydrophone to detect bells rung from lighthouses and lightships underwater. The case was a thick, hollow brass disc 35 centimetres (14 in) in diameter. On one face was a one-millimetre-thick (1/32 in) brass diaphragm, which was coupled by a short brass rod to a carbon microphone.

=== World War I ===
Early in the war, French President Raymond Poincaré provided Paul Langevin with the facilities needed to work on a method to locate submarines by the echos from sound pulses. They developed a piezoelectric hydrophone by increasing the power of the signal with a vacuum tube amplifier; the high acoustic impedance of piezoelectric materials facilitated their use as underwater transducers. The same piezoelectric plate could be vibrated by an electrical oscillator to produce the sound pulses.

The first submarine to be detected and sunk using a primitive hydrophone was the German submarine UC-3 on 23 April 1916. UC-3 was detected by the anti-submarine trawler Cheerio as the Cheerio was directly over the UC-3; the UC-3 was then caught in a steel net dragged by the trawler, and sank after a large underwater explosion.

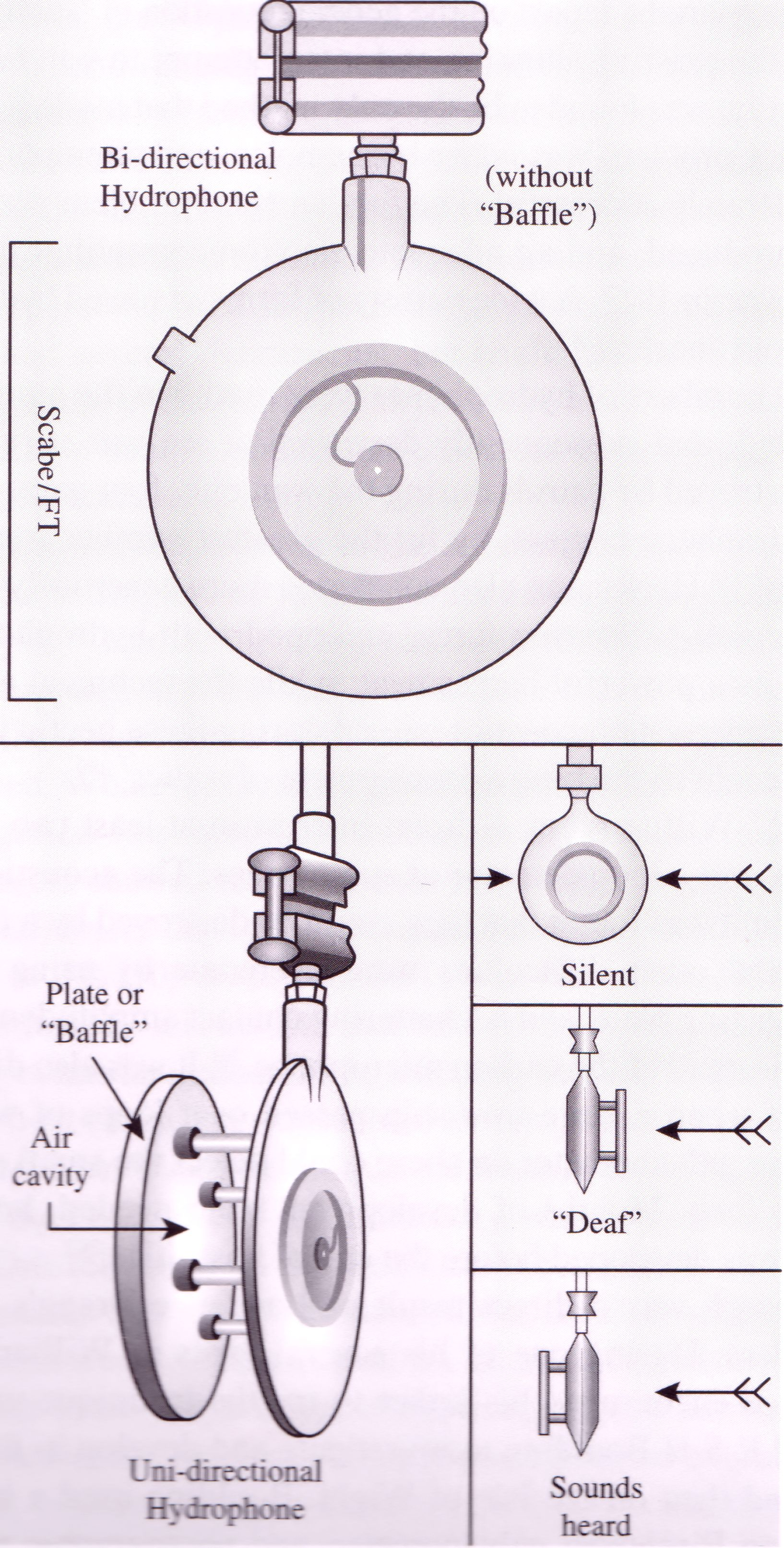
Hydrophones and directional hydrophones using a baffle.

Later in the war, the British Admiralty belatedly convened a scientific panel to advise on how to combat U-boats. It included the Australian physicist William Henry Bragg and the New Zealand physicist Sir Ernest Rutherford. They concluded that the best hope was to use hydrophones to listen for submarines. Rutherford's research produced his sole patent for a hydrophone. Bragg took the lead in July 1916 and he moved to the Admiralty hydrophone research establishment at Hawkcraig on the Firth of Forth.

The scientists set two goals: to develop a hydrophone that could hear a submarine despite the noise generated by the patrol ship carrying the hydrophone, and to develop a hydrophone that could reveal the bearing of the submarine. A bidirectional hydrophone was invented at East London College. They mounted a microphone on each side of a diaphragm in a cylindrical case; when the sounds heard from both microphones have the same intensity, the microphone is in line with the sound source.

Bragg's laboratory made such a hydrophone directional by mounting a baffle in front of one side of the diaphragm. It took months to discover that effective baffles must contain a layer of air. In 1918, airships of the Royal Naval Air Service engaged in anti-submarine warfare experimented by trailing dipped hydrophones. Bragg tested a hydrophone from a captured German U-boat and found it inferior to British models. By the end of the war, the British had 38 hydrophone officers and 200 qualified listeners, paid an additional 4d per day.

From late in World War I until the introduction of active sonar in the early 1920s, hydrophones were the sole method for submarines to detect targets while submerged; they remain useful today.

== Directional hydrophones ==
A small single cylindrical ceramic transducer can achieve near perfect omnidirectional reception. Directional hydrophones increase sensitivity from one direction using two basic techniques:

=== Focused transducers ===
This device uses a single transducer element with a dish or conical-shaped sound reflector to focus the signals, in a similar manner to a reflecting telescope. This type of hydrophone can be produced from a low-cost omnidirectional type, but must be used while stationary, as the reflector impedes its movement through water. A new way to direct is to use a spherical body around the hydrophone. The advantage of directivity spheres is that the hydrophone can be moved within the water, ridding it of the interferences produced by a conical-shaped element.

=== Arrays ===
Multiple hydrophones can be arranged in an array so that it will add the signals from the desired direction while subtracting signals from other directions. The array may be steered using a beamformer. Most commonly, hydrophones are arranged in a "line array" but may be in many different arrangements depending on what is being measured. As an example, in the article measuring propeller noise from fleet ships required complex hydrophone array systems to achieve actionable measurements.

SOSUS hydrophones, laid on the seabed and connected by underwater cables, were used, beginning in the 1950s, by the U.S. Navy to track movement of Soviet submarines during the Cold War along a line from Greenland, Iceland and the United Kingdom known as the GIUK gap. These are capable of clearly recording extremely low frequency infrasound, including many unexplained ocean sounds.

== See also ==
- Diving Patterns of Goose-Beaked Whales
- Communication with submarines
- Geophone
- Underwater acoustics
- Sonar
- Reflection seismology
