= WSUR =

WSUR may refer to:

- WSUR-DT, a satellite station of WLII-DT
- Washington State University Reactor
- The former callsign of WXSU-LP
