= JASON reactor =

Nuclear reactor in Greenwich, London, England

Coordinates: 51.4825°N 0.0062°W

JASON was a low-power nuclear research reactor installed by the Ministry of Defence at the Royal Naval College in Greenwich, London, now home to the University of Greenwich, to educate and train military and civilian personnel involved in the naval nuclear submarine propulsion.

== Design ==
It was an Argonaut series 10 kW research reactor designed by the US Argonne National Laboratory, and was used by the Royal Navy for experimental and training purposes. The actual reactor type used in the Royal Navy's nuclear-powered submarines is a pressurised water reactor supplying tens of megawatts of power.

JASON was one of very few reactors operating within a major population centre (another was at Queen Mary in east London)– and undoubtedly the only one installed in a 17th-century building. The Royal Naval College building was the former Greenwich Hospital, built between 1696 and 1712 by Christopher Wren, where the reactor was located within the King William Building. The existence of a nuclear reactor so close to central London was largely unknown to the general public, even at the time that "Maritime Greenwich" was named a UNESCO World Heritage Site in 1997.

== Operations and decommissioning ==
JASON was operational at the site from 1962 to 1996 (it had previously been operated by the Hawker Siddeley Nuclear Power Corporation from February 1959 at Langley, Slough), and fully dismantled by 1999. 270 tonnes (297 U.S. tons; 595,248 lbs) of radioactive waste was removed.

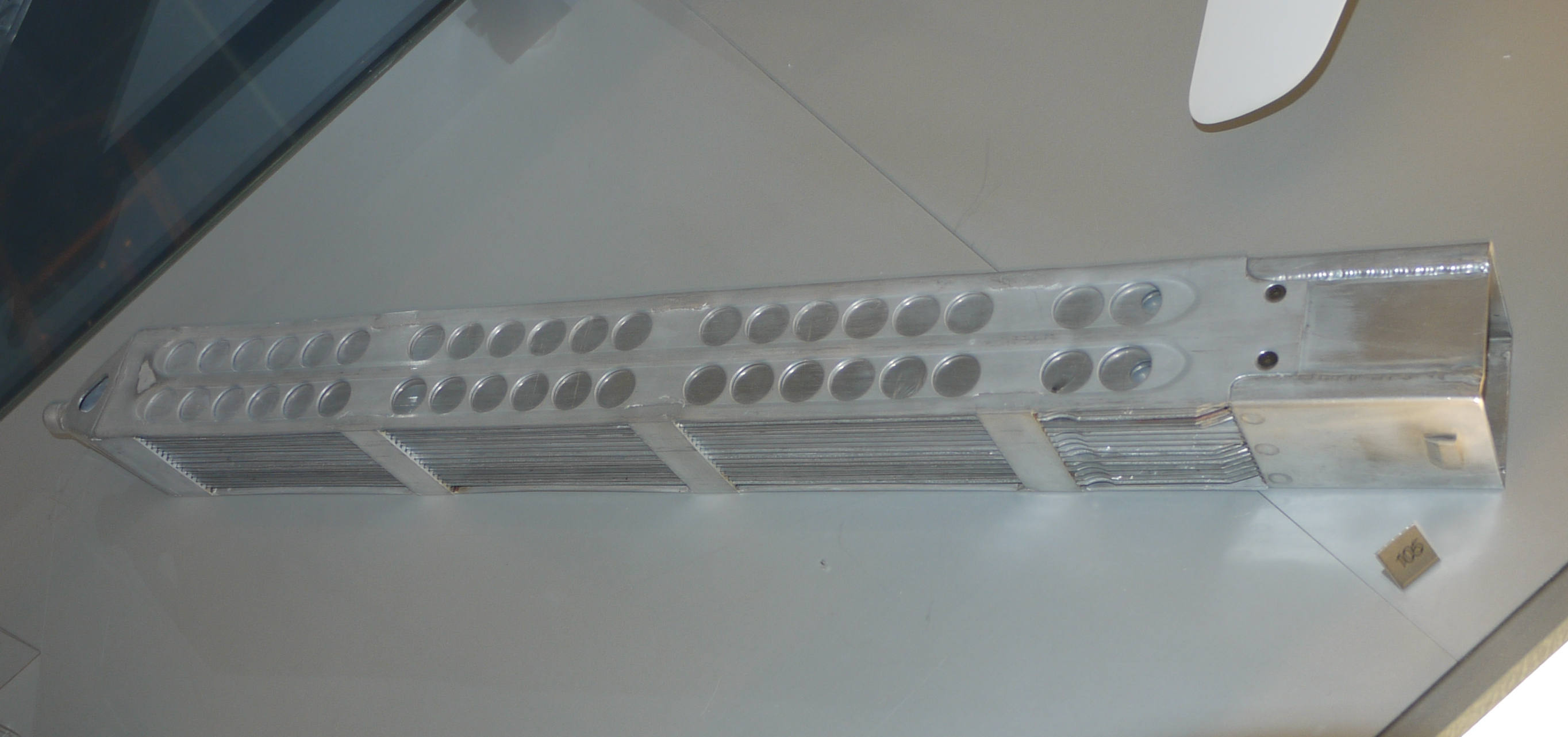
A JASON fuel rod replica

The European Commission brought a case (C-61/03 Commission v. United Kingdom) against the UK at the European Court of Justice, for failing to fulfill its obligations under the Euratom Treaty. The case was dismissed on 12 April 2005, the court confirming that the treaty does not apply to uses of nuclear energy for military purposes.

== See also ==
- List of nuclear reactors
