= Réacteur Université de Strasbourg =

Coordinates: 48°36′0″N 7°42′0″E

The Réacteur Universitaire de Strasbourg (RUS) was a 100 kW thermal Argonaut-class reactor built at the University Louis-Pasteur, located in the commune of Schiltigheim near Strasbourg. RUS went critical on 22 November 1966 and ended operations on 31 May 1995. Its decommissioning was finalized in 2009.

== History ==
The design of university training reactor RUS was based on the Argonaut research reactor developed by the Argonne National Laboratory in the mid-1950s, in the United States. A second Argonaut-class reactor, the Ulysse reactor, was already in operation in France at the Saclay research centre of the French Alternative Energies and Atomic Energy Commission. The University Reactor of Strasbourg was the Basic Nuclear Installation (BNI) No. 44.

The reactor core consisted of an internal graphite neutron reflector surrounded by a ring of MTR-type nuclear fuel elements with an average ^{235}U enrichment of 92.5% and an external graphite neutron reflector. The highly enriched uranium (93%) was supplied by the United States.

The reactor was primarily a research instrument for conducting experimental irradiations, activation-based analysis of nuclear chemistry, solid-state physics, biology and the production of short-lived radioisotopes. A variety of cavities were available, including a 7.3-metre "biological cavity", to perform those experiments. Pneumatic conveyor systems make short irradiations possible to immediately study the irradiated materials in the laboratories adjacent to the reactor hall.

The final shutdown of the RUS reactor was decided in February 2006. The RUS reactor was dismantled from August 2006 to December 2008. The final decommissioning of INB No. 44 was pronounced in October 2012.
