= Risley, Warrington =

Risley
- Neighbourhood
- Risley's location in Cheshire
- Coordinates: 53°25′47″N 2°31′19″W
- Country: United Kingdom
- Country: England
- County: Cheshire
- Town: Warrington
- Historic county: Lancashire

Risley is a district in the northeast corner of Warrington, in the Warrington district, in the ceremonial county of Cheshire, England.

Within the boundaries of the historic county of Lancashire, it lies south of Culcheth and is historically part of the parish of Croft. During the Second World War it was the location of a Royal Ordnance Factory, ROF Risley. After the war it became the site of the design offices and laboratories for the United Kingdom's nuclear weapons and nuclear power programmes. Universities Research Reactor was operational in Risley until 1991. Today the bulk of the area forms the new town of Birchwood.

HMP Risley is located in the area. The institution opened as a Remand Centre in 1964, but is now a Category C prison for adult males.
