= Argonaut class reactor =

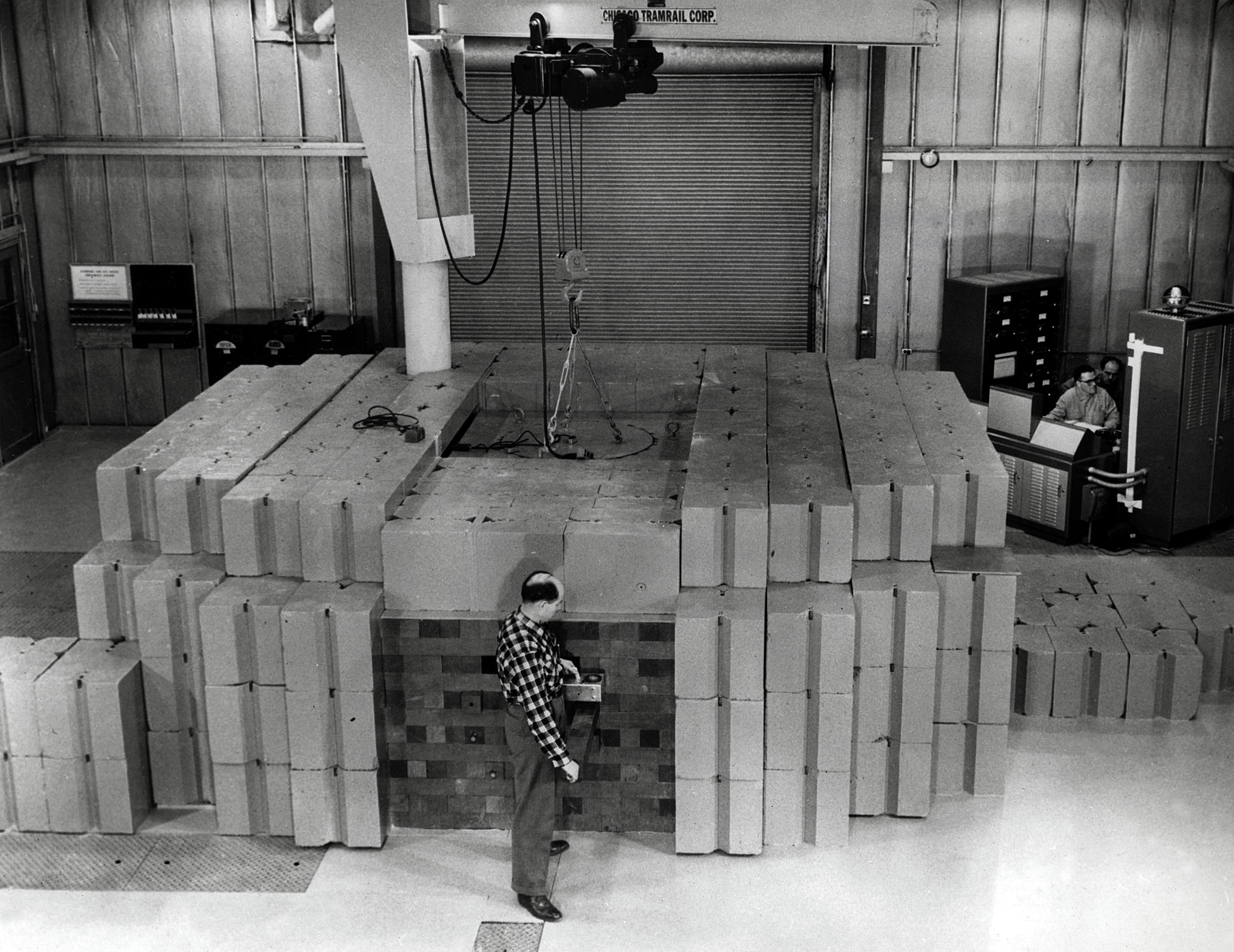
An employee checks the activity level of a stringer withdraw from the thermal column of the Argonaut reactor at Argonne

The Argonaut class reactor is a design of small nuclear research reactor. Many have been built throughout the world, over a wide range of power levels. Its functions are to teach nuclear reactor theory, nuclear physics and for use in engineering laboratory experiments.

== Description ==
The original Argonaut (Argonne Nuclear Assembly for University Training) was built at Argonne National Laboratory and went critical for the first time on February 9, 1957. It was shut down in 1972. This reactor was rated for 10 kilowatts.

List of Argonaut-class research reactors in the world
Country	Facility Name	Institution	Thermal Power (kW)	Status	First criticality	Final shutdown	References
Australia	MOATA	Australian Atomic Energy Commission	100	Decommissioned	01/04/1961	31/05/1995	
Austria	Siemens Argonaut Reaktor-Graz (SAR-Graz)	Graz University of Technology	10	Decommissioned	17/05/1965	31/08/2004	
Brazil	Argonauta	Instituto de Engenharia Nuclear (IEN)	0.2	Operational	20/02/1965	–	
France	Ulysse	CEA	100	Decommissioned	23/07/1961	2007	
France	Réacteur Université de Strasbourg (RUS)	University of Strasbourg	100	Decommissioned	1967	12/1997	
Germany	Rossendorfer Ringzonen Reaktor (RRR)	Strahlenschutz, Analytik und Entsorgung Rossendorf e.V.	1	Decommissioned	16/12/1962	25/09/1991	
Germany	Schnell-Thermischen Argonaut-Reaktor (STARK)	Karlsruhe Institute of Technology	0.01	Decommissioned	11/01/1963	03/1976	
Germany	AEG Prüfreaktor (PR-10)	Kraftwerk Union AG (KWU)	0.18	Decommissioned	27/01/1961	1976	
Germany	Siemens Argonaut Reactor (SAR)	Technical University of Munich	1	Decommissioned	23/06/1968	31/10/1968	
Italy	Reattore Bologna Due (RB-2)	AGIP Nucleare	10	Decommissioned	28/05/1963	12/1980	
Japan	University Test Reactor (UTR)	Kinki University	0.001	Operational	11/11/1961	–	
Netherlands	Low Flux Reactor (LFR)	Nuclear Research and Consultancy Group	30	Decommissioned	28/08/1960	12/2010	
Netherlands	Atoomreactor THE NEderland (ATHENE)	Eindhoven University of Technology	10	Decommissioned	03/02/1969	1973	
Spain	Argos Research Reactor	Polytechnic University of Catalonia	1	Decommissioned	11/06/1962	06/09/1977	
Spain	Argonaut Reactor Bilbao (ARBI)	University School of Technical Industrial Engineering of Bilbao	10	Decommissioned	26/02/1962	1974	
Taiwan	Tsing Hua Argonaut Reactor (THAR)	National Tsing Hua University	10	Decommissioned	20/04/1974	05/1991	
UK	Neutron Source Thermal Reactor (NESTOR)	AEE Winfrith	30	Decommissioned	01/01/1961	06/1995	
UK	Jason	Royal Naval College	10	Decommissioned	30/09/1959	07/1996	
UK	UTR-300	Scottish Universities Research and Reactor Centre	300	Decommissioned	01/06/1963	09/1995	
UK	UTR-B	Queen Mary University of London	100	Decommissioned	10/06/1968	04/1982	
UK	Universities Research Reactor	University of Liverpool Victoria University of Manchester	300	Decommissioned	07/07/1964	07/1991	
USA	University of Florida Training Reactor (UFTR)	University of Florida	100	Operational	28/05/1959	–	
USA	UTR Test Reactor	American Radiator and Standard Sanitary Corporation	0.015	Decommissioned	01/12/1961	1963	
USA	University Teaching and Research Reactor (UTR-1)	American Radiator and Standard Sanitary Corporation	0.001	Decommissioned	01/02/1958	1960	
USA	Juggernaut	Argonne National Laboratory	250	Decommissioned	11/01/1962	04/1970	
USA	UTR-10	Virginia Tech	100	Decommissioned	01/12/1959	1984	
USA	UTR-10	Iowa State University	10	Decommissioned	01/10/1959	05/1998	
USA	UWNR	University of Washington	100	Decommissioned	01/04/1961	06/1988	
USA	UCLA R1	UCLA	100	Decommissioned	01/10/1960	01/1984	

== See also ==
- UF Training Reactor
- More Hall Annex
