= ASTRA (reactor) =

Coordinates: 47.9594°N 16.51584°E

ASTRA (Adaptierter Schwimmbecken-Typ-Reaktor Austria, English translation: Adapted swimming pool-type reactor Austria) was a type of nuclear research reactor built in Seibersdorf, Austria near Vienna, at the site of the former Austrian Reactor Center Seibersdorf which now forms part of the Austrian Institute of Technology (AIT). ASTRA operated from 1960 to 1999.

== Research ==
Date	Power
September 1960	100kW (initial criticality)
May 1962	1MW
August 1962	5MW
August 1969	6MW
1972	7MW
January 1975	8MW
~1989	9.5MW
1999	decommissioned

One of the most advanced experiments in physics carried out at the ASTRA reactor was an experiment on the decay of free neutrons. In this experiment, the electron-neutrino angular correlation in free neutron decay was measured via the shape of the energy spectrum of the recoil protons; the center of a highly evacuated tangential beam tube of the reactor served as neutron source.

The aim was to determine the ratio of the two coupling constants g_{A} and g_{V} of the weak interaction from the shape of the recoil proton spectrum. This spectrum was measured using an electrostatic spectrometer; the protons were counted using an ion electron converter of the coincidence type.

The result was |g_{A}/g_{V}| = 1.259 ± 0.017. This is in good agreement with the later (much more accurate) average g_{A}/g_{V} = - 1.2695 ± 0.0029; this value was measured using polarised neutrons and hence contains also the sign of the ratio.

== Literature ==
- R. Dobrozemsky: Production of a Clean Neutron Gas for Decay and Scattering Experiments. In: Nuclear Instruments and Methods. 118 (1974) 1–37.
