= UF Training Reactor =

Nuclear research reactor in Florida, US

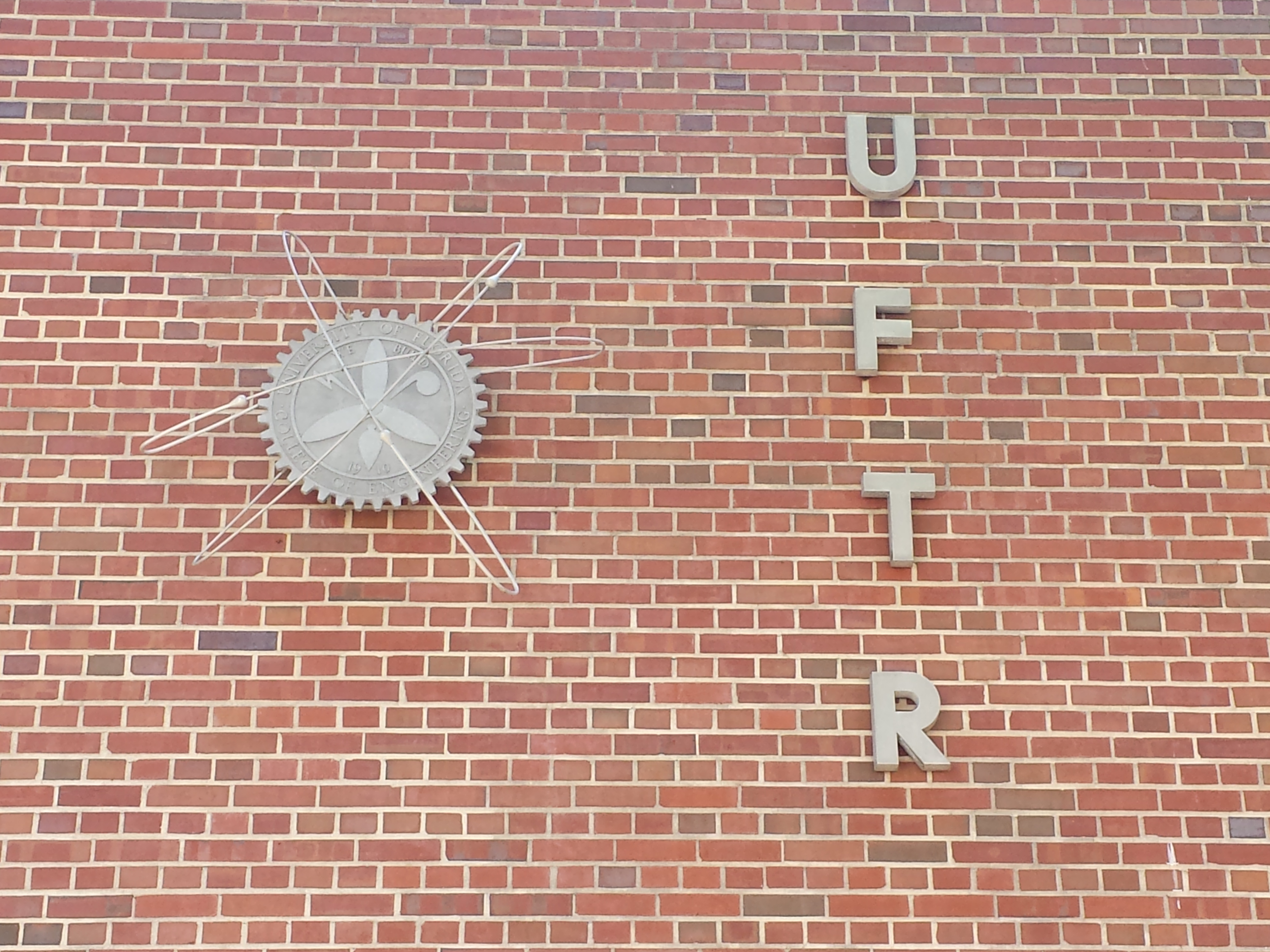
- Operating institution: University of Florida
- Location: Gainesville, Florida
- Type: Argonaut
- Power: (100kW)

Technical specifications
- Cooling: Light water

The University of Florida Training Reactor (UFTR), commissioned in 1959, is a 100 kW modified Argonaut-type reactor at the University of Florida in Gainesville, Florida. It is a light water and graphite moderated, graphite reflected, light water cooled reactor designed and used primarily for training and nuclear research related activities. The reactor is licensed by the Nuclear Regulatory Commission and is the only research reactor in Florida.

The UFTR is integral to the Nuclear Engineering Program (NEP) at the University of Florida and it offers the ability for students to learn the fundamentals of nuclear operation, neutron detection, and reactor physics. The UFTR also offers unique training opportunities for students enrolled at other educational institutions as well as future reactor operators or technical experts at commercial nuclear plants since it enables the ability to perform and analyze reactor manipulations not often performed at commercial facilities. Courses offered using the UFTR include a Radiation Detection Lab, Neutronics Lab, Reactor Experiments Lab, and Reactor Operations Lab.

== History ==
The UFTR resumed operations in April, 2015 after a multi-year facility refurbishment to upgrade the physical infrastructure, including new low enrichment uranium (LEU) fuel, replacement of the HVAC systems, upgraded security systems, and various instrumentation and control (I&C) system upgrades. The reactor's power level is regulated by cadmium blades that act as mechanical shim (analogous to control rods in a pressurized water reactor). Nominal maximum thermal flux density for the UFTR is 1.8E12 neutrons/cm^{2}·s.

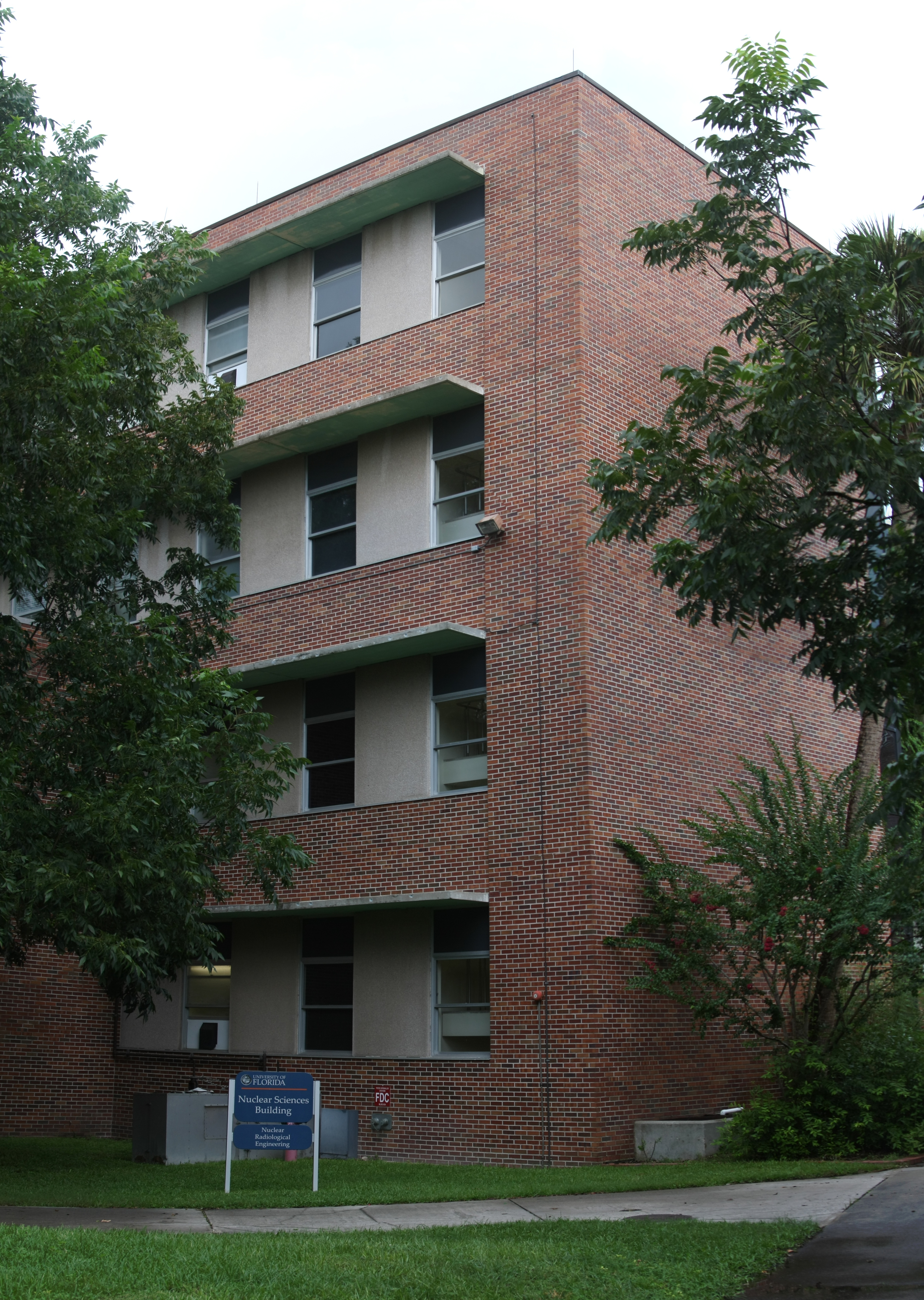
Nuclear Sciences Building

== Services ==
Services offered to the UF community and external academic, government and corporate users include:

- Neutron Activation Analysis (NAA)
- Neutron Irradiation
- Radiation Effects Testing on Materials
- Research Partnerships
- Training

The University of Florida NEP has seven primary faculty, five affiliated faculty, 100 enrolled undergraduate majors, and 40 masters and doctoral students. The departmental facilities include, in addition to the UFTR, a uranium metal-fueled sub-critical facility, a high-output fusion neutron generator irradiation laboratory, 1 and 10 curie Plutonium-Beryllium (Pu-Be) neutron sources, a radiochemistry laboratory with hot-cell and decontamination capabilities, a neutron activation analysis laboratory, and multi-user nuclear instrumentation laboratory work stations.
