= MOATA =

Nuclear reactor in Lucas Heights, Sydney, Australia

Coordinates: 34°03′05.89″S 150°58′45.23″E

MOATA was a 100 kW thermal Argonaut class reactor built at the Australian Atomic Energy Commission (later ANSTO) Research Establishment at Lucas Heights, Sydney. MOATA went critical at 5:50am on 10 April 1961 and ended operations on 31 May 1995. MOATA was the first reactor to be decommissioned in Australia in 2009.

== Background ==
The design of the university training reactor MOATA was based on the Argonaut research reactor developed by the Argonne National Laboratory in the mid-1950s, in the United States. Moata is an Aboriginal word meaning "gentle-fire" or "fire-stick".

MOATA was designed and manufactured by the Advanced Technology Laboratories and first went critical on 10 April 1961.

The purpose of the reactor was for training nuclear scientists in reactor operations and neutron physics. However, by the mid-1970s, its official envelope was expanded to include activation analysis and neutron radiography, soil analysis, and nuclear medical research.

== Decommissioning ==
The reactor was shut down in 1995 as it was no longer possible to economically justify its continued operations. Experimental data on nuclear fuel and moderator systems was also accumulated during its lifetime. By 2009, the reactor had been completely dismantled and the site is now fully restored. It was the first reactor to be decommissioned in Australia.

In 1995, the spent fuel from the reactor was unloaded and in 2006, it was shipped to the United States under the US Department of Energy’s Foreign Research Reactor Spent Nuclear Fuel Acceptance.
