= Washington State University Reactor =

Nuclear research reactor in Washington State University

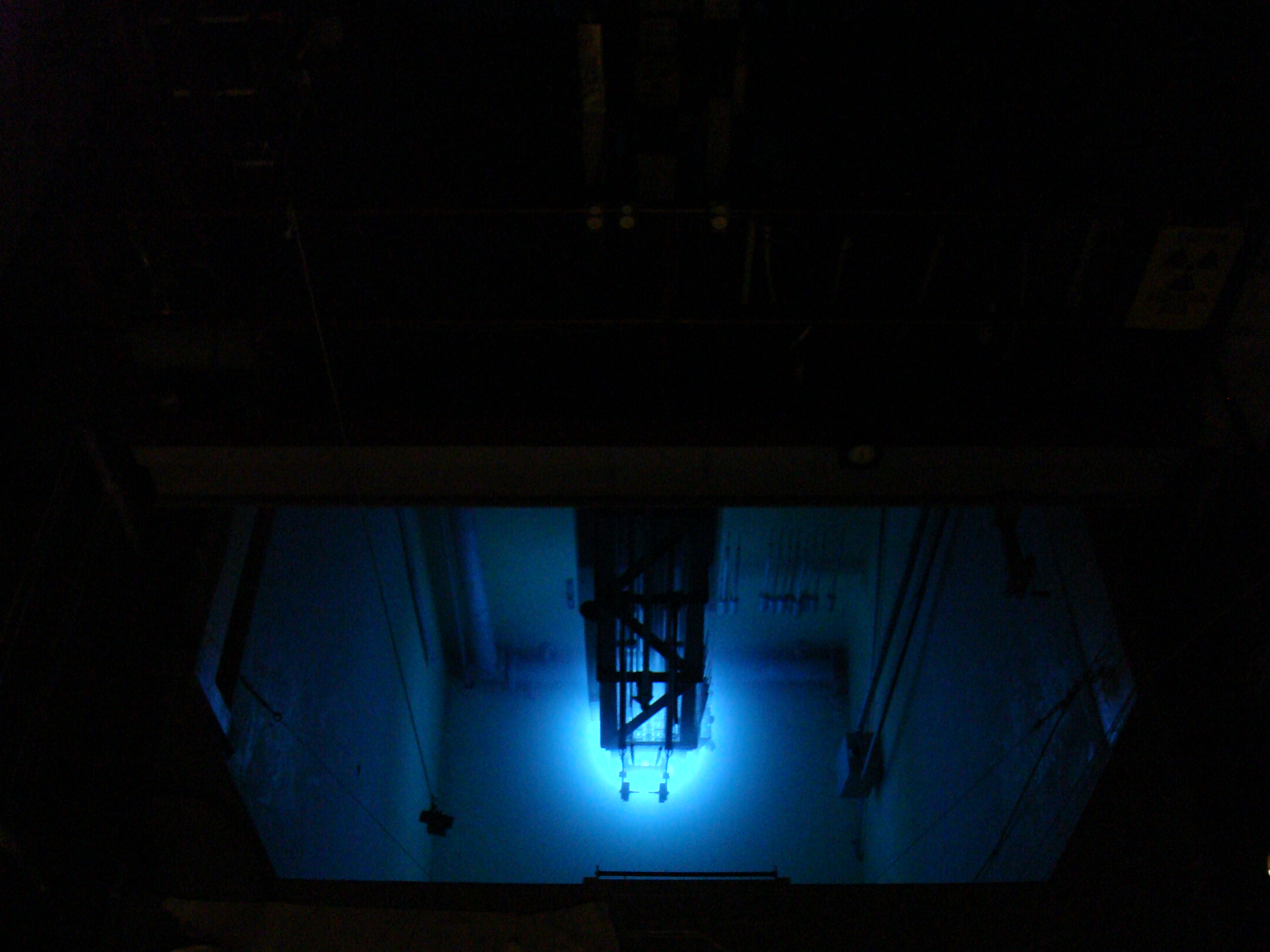
- The WSUR Core at Steady State 1MW
- Operating institution: Washington State University
- Location: Pullman, Washington
- Coordinates: 46°44′10″N 117°08′37″W
- Type: TRIGA Conversion
- Power: 1 MW (thermal)

Construction and upkeep
- Construction cost: $479,000 USD
- Construction began: 1957
- First criticality: March 7, 1961
- Staff: 3
- Operators: 12

Technical specifications
- Max thermal flux: 7.00E+12 n/cm^2-s (est.)
- Max fast flux: 4.00E+12 n/cm^2-s (est.)
- Fuel type: TRIGA type
- Cooling: light water
- Neutron moderator: Zr-H & light water
- Neutron reflector: graphite
- Control rods: 1 B4C Pulse Rod, 3 Boral Blades, 1 Stainless Steel Blade
- Cladding material: 304 Stainless Steel

The Washington State University Reactor (WSUR) is housed in the Dodgen Research Facility, and was completed in 1961. The (then) Washington State College Reactor was the brainchild of Harold W. Dodgen, a former researcher on the Manhattan Project where he earned his PhD from 1943 to 1946. He secured funding for the ambitious 'Reactor Project' from the National Science Foundation, the Atomic Energy Commission, and the College administration totaling $479,000 ($1.79 million in 2025 dollars). Dodgen's basis for constructing a reactor was that the College was primely located as a training facility for the Hanford site, as well as Idaho National Laboratory because there was no other research reactor in the West at that time. After completing the extensive application and design process with the help of contractors from General Electric they broke ground in August 1957 and the first criticality was achieved on March 7, 1961 at a power level of 1W. They gradually increased power over the next year to achieve their maximum licensed operating power of 100 kW.

It was initially a General Electric Materials Test Reactor with plate-type fuel bundles, but was upgraded in 1967 to a 1MW General Atomics TRIGA (Teaching Research Isotopes General Atomics) reactor. Standard TRIGA fuel rods are cylindrical rods, clad in stainless steel utilizing Uranium-235 dispersed in a ceramic zirconium-hydride matrix as fuel. The WSUR operated with this TRIGA fuel until the Fuel Life Improvement Program (FLIP) once again upgraded the reactor in 1976 with a partial new core of high-enriched 'TRIGA FLIP' fuel designed for an extended lifetime. Two years later, in 1978, due to global fears of nuclear proliferation it was federally mandated that all high-enriched reactor fuel (except for military use) be replaced with Low Enriched Uranium Fuel (LEU). Due to the extensive work, cost, and the number of research reactors undergoing the procedure, the WSUR was not converted until October 2008. All FLIP fuel was replaced by another TRIGA fuel known as 30/20 LEU and when the new core went critical on October 7, 2008 it became the world's only mixed 8.5/20 (Standard TRIGA) and 30/20 LEU core. The facility license was renewed for an additional 20 years upon completion of a safety analysis and review. The effective date was September 30, 2011.

== Design ==
The WSUR core consists of a rectangular aluminum box suspended from a movable bridge structure. Surrounding the core is a 247,000 liter pool of high purity deionized light water, which is used as both a coolant, shield, and moderator. Inside the core box there is a bottom grid-plate into which 3 and 4-rod clusters of TRIGA fuel sit separated by boron-aluminum (Boral, boron carbide in aluminium matrix) control elements. These control elements are raised out of the core via servo-motors to control reactor power. Power is monitored via three different and independent detectors that sit inside the core structure; there is a compensated ion chamber, an uncompensated ion chamber, and a fission chamber in three of the four corners of the grid box.

Due to the highly energetic nature of the fission process, a substantial amount of heat is generated during operation (~350 °C). The fuel is cooled by the natural convection of light water which is circulated through a plate-type heat exchanger with a primary and secondary loop. A cooling tower is utilized to discharge heat from the secondary loop to the environment, ensuring that the system remains well within temperature limits while preventing environmental exposure of water which has contacted the reactor. The WSUR is purely a research reactor, lacking both a pressure vessel and steam turbine which are used to generate electricity in power reactors.

The primary use for the WSUR is to generate neutrons which can be used for a multitude of experimental purposes. There are several specialized experimental facilities for Neutron Activation Analysis and isotope production (see below), and several generalized sample rotator tubes whereby samples are lowered into the core for a set time, then pulled back out and sent to the laboratory where the data analysis will take place.

== Pulsing ==
Like many TRIGA reactors, the WSUR has the ability to pulse. Ordinarily the WSUR runs at a steady state power level of 1MW, however because of the unique characteristics of TRIGA fuel it can be pulsed to approximately 1000 times this power for a very short amount of time. This ability is due to the fact that TRIGA fuel is designed with a prompt negative temperature coefficient of reactivity, which means that as the fuel heats up, it becomes less and less reactive (it shuts itself down). So when one of the control elements (known as the transient rod) is ejected from the core via air pressure at high speeds, the reactor jumps in power from ~80 watts to over a 1 billion watts and back down again in 50 milliseconds, causing a bright blue flash of Cerenkov radiation. There is a video of this effect on the WSUNSC webpage (see references).

== Research ==
Neutron activation analysis is a method used to determine elemental concentrations in unknown samples. It is especially useful for determining amounts of heavy metals (to parts per billion) in samples that are often as small as 10 mg. The WSUR can even do NAA research by pulsing samples. Examples of past research projects that have used this unique and valuable analysis method include determining quantities of toxic metals, such as arsenic, zinc, and selenium in air filters, tree rings, and other environmental samples. NAA can also be used to find trace elements in biological materials. This can be especially useful in plant or animal nutrient and health studies. Argon dating of geological samples can even be performed using the reactor and associated NAA equipment. The WSUR also uses the neutrons it generates to produce isotopes for various other fields.

== Epithermal neutron beam facility ==
The WSU TRIGA reactor has an external epithermal neutron beam facility. This beam is a well-collimated, high-flux, medium energy dry neutron beam. It can also be modified to generate low energy neutrons. This beam facility is enclosed in a special high-radiation area room, and was built in conjunction with the Idaho National Engineering Laboratory for cancer research. Ongoing projects include Boron-Neutron Capture Therapy (BNCT) research, especially that research for a cure for brain tumors, although the beam can be used for any neutron-capture therapy. This beam can also be used for neutron radiography, a non-destructive technique for examining 'heavy' materials such as steel for internal 'light' materials, such as cracks in castings, voids in welds, or fluid flows inside pipes.

== Cobalt-60 source ==
The cobalt-60 gamma irradiator is also housed in the reactor pool and is a separate system from the reactor itself. The WSU College of Veterinary Medicine, as well as several Biology graduate students use the source as a means for sterilization of biological samples as it is much cheaper and faster than an autoclave.

== See also ==
- List of nuclear reactors
- More Hall Annex, reactor in Seattle until 1988
- TRIGA
