= Austrian Institute of Technology =

Austrian research organization

Coordinates: 47°58′34″N 16°30′31″E

logo of the Austrian Institute of Technology

AIT Austrian Institute of Technology is Austria's largest Research and Technology Organization (RTO), employing about 1,400 people mostly based at the main facilities Vienna Giefinggasse, Seibersdorf, Wiener Neustadt, Ranshofen, and Graz.

In June 2009 the name was changed from Austrian Research Centers (ARC) to AIT Austrian Institute of Technology GmbH.

It is owned by the Republic of Austria (through the Ministry of Climate Action and Energy with 50.46% and by the Federation of Austrian Industries with 49.54%).

The managing directors are Andreas Kugi, Brigitte Bach, and Alexander Svejkovsky.

== Organization ==
Centers

The company is structured in seven Centers:

- Energy
- Health & Bioresources
- Digital Safety & Security
- Vision, Automation & Control
- Low-Emission Transport
- Technology Experience
- Innovation Systems & Policy

Subsidiaries

AIT has the following wholly owned subsidiaries:

- Seibersdorf Labor GmbH
- Nuclear Engineering Seibersdorf GmbH
- Leichtmetallkompetenzzentrum Ranshofen GmbH - LKR

== See also ==
- ASTRA (reactor)
