= PLUTO reactor =

Materials testing nuclear reactor at Harwell, Oxfordshire, United Kingdom

Coordinates: 51.569708°N 1.32809°W

PLUTO was a materials testing nuclear reactor housed at the Atomic Energy Research Establishment, a former Royal Air Force airfield at Harwell, Oxfordshire in the United Kingdom.

== Background ==
PLUTO was one of five reactors on the site. The site was selected as the scientific center for research and development of UK's expanding nuclear programs. Designed by the United Kingdom Atomic Energy Authority (UKAEA), the reactor was built by Head Wrightson Processes Ltd, an industrial firm in Teesside, England.

PLUTO was one of two high flux reactors; the first, DIDO, was its prototype. PLUTO was the second of three DIDO class reactors in the UK to become operational. PLUTO and DIDO were located at Harwell; the third, Dounreay (DMTR) was built in Caithness, Scotland. The development of multi-purpose type PLUTO reactors gave rise to many countries building their own materials testing reactors based on DIDO's design. On 27 October 1957, the PLUTO reactor was commissioned and operated for thirty three years before decommissioning in 1990.

== Design ==
PLUTO was based on the design of DIDO and used enriched uranium metal fuel, and heavy water as both neutron moderator and primary coolant. The core was a cylinder with a diameter of 87.5 centimetres (34.4 in) and a height of approximately 61 centimetres (24 in). The radioactive shielding consisted of 0.65 centimetres (0.26 in) boron, 10.2 centimetres (4.0 in) lead, 45 centimetres (18 in) of iron shot concrete, and 120 centimetres (47 in) of barytes concrete. There was a graphite neutron reflector surrounding the core. The fuel element was an eighty-per cent enriched uranium, U-235, alloyed with aluminum plates. The PLUTO reactor started operating at 10 MW thermal power but increased during upgrades to 25 MW during its operation.

== Tests Performed ==
The multipurpose PLUTO reactor had many diverse functions; testing materials for commercial reactors to investigating crystal structures. Its main functions were fuel production, materials testing and sample activation experiments which involved testing the effects of graphite behavior under irradiation. Materials testing at the Harwell site involved irradiating materials using the reactors. This happened in one of 3 locations, a Mark V hollow fuel element in the Pluto reactor, a flux position in DIDO, and the flux converter in PLUTO. The aim of the flux converter was to give the materials the spectrum of low spatial variation of neutron and gamma fluxes seen by a light-water reactor rather than the heavy-water reactor, PLUTO. An experiment performed to test the effects of graphite behavior under irradiation revealed the effects of irradiation for 20–30 years in a civil reactor from materials tested in these reactors during the course of a few months. Other activities and experiments carried out were:physics research such as neutron scattering, chemistry studies, and radioisotopes production used in medical facilities and other industries. Because the twin reactors, PLUTO and DIDO, worked on a continuous basis rotating in and out of operation, there was continued flow of short-lived radioisotopes for hospitals. The radioisotopes generated account for 70% of the UK radioisotopes sold on the international markets.

== Decommissioning ==
PLUTO reactor went critical in 1957 and reached its end of life in 1990. It is expected to be completely dismantled by 2024. Decommissioning is carried out in three stages, as defined by the International Atomic Energy Agency (IAEA) Standards. It began with the shutdown of the reactor following closure of nuclear plant. The first stage was removing radioactive materials and operational waste. Second stage involved dismantling active and non-active plants but keeping building structure and the reactor shield intact. Stage three involved demolishing building structures, dismantling the reactor core and bio shield, and site cleanup of all radioactive waste to restore site for other purposes. By 1994 and 1995, PLUTO was at stage two decommissioning

== See also ==
- List of nuclear reactors
