= DIDO (nuclear reactor) =

Materials testing nuclear reactor housed at Harwell, Oxfordshire, United Kingdom

Coordinates: 51.568794°N 1.325558°W

DIDO was a materials testing nuclear reactor at the Atomic Energy Research Establishment at Harwell, Oxfordshire in the United Kingdom. It used enriched uranium metal fuel, and heavy water as both neutron moderator and primary coolant. There was also a graphite neutron reflector surrounding the core. In the design phase, DIDO was known as AE334 after its engineering design number.

DIDO was designed to have a high neutron flux, largely to reduce the time required for testing of materials intended for use in nuclear power reactors. This also allowed for the production of intense beams of neutrons for use in neutron diffraction.

DIDO was shut down in 1990 and is under planning for decommissioning.

In all, six DIDO class reactors were constructed based on this design:

- DIDO, first criticality 1956.
- PLUTO, also at Harwell, first criticality 1957.
- HIFAR (Australia), first criticality January 1958.
- Dounreay Materials Testing Reactor (DMTR) at Dounreay Nuclear Power Development Establishment in Scotland, first criticality May 1958.
- DR-3 at Risø National Laboratory (Denmark), first criticality January 1960.
- FRJ-II at Jülich Research Centre (Germany), first criticality 1962.

HIFAR was the last to shut down, in 2007.

== See also ==
- List of nuclear reactors
