= More Hall Annex =

Former nuclear laboratory in historic building, Seattle, Washington, U.S.

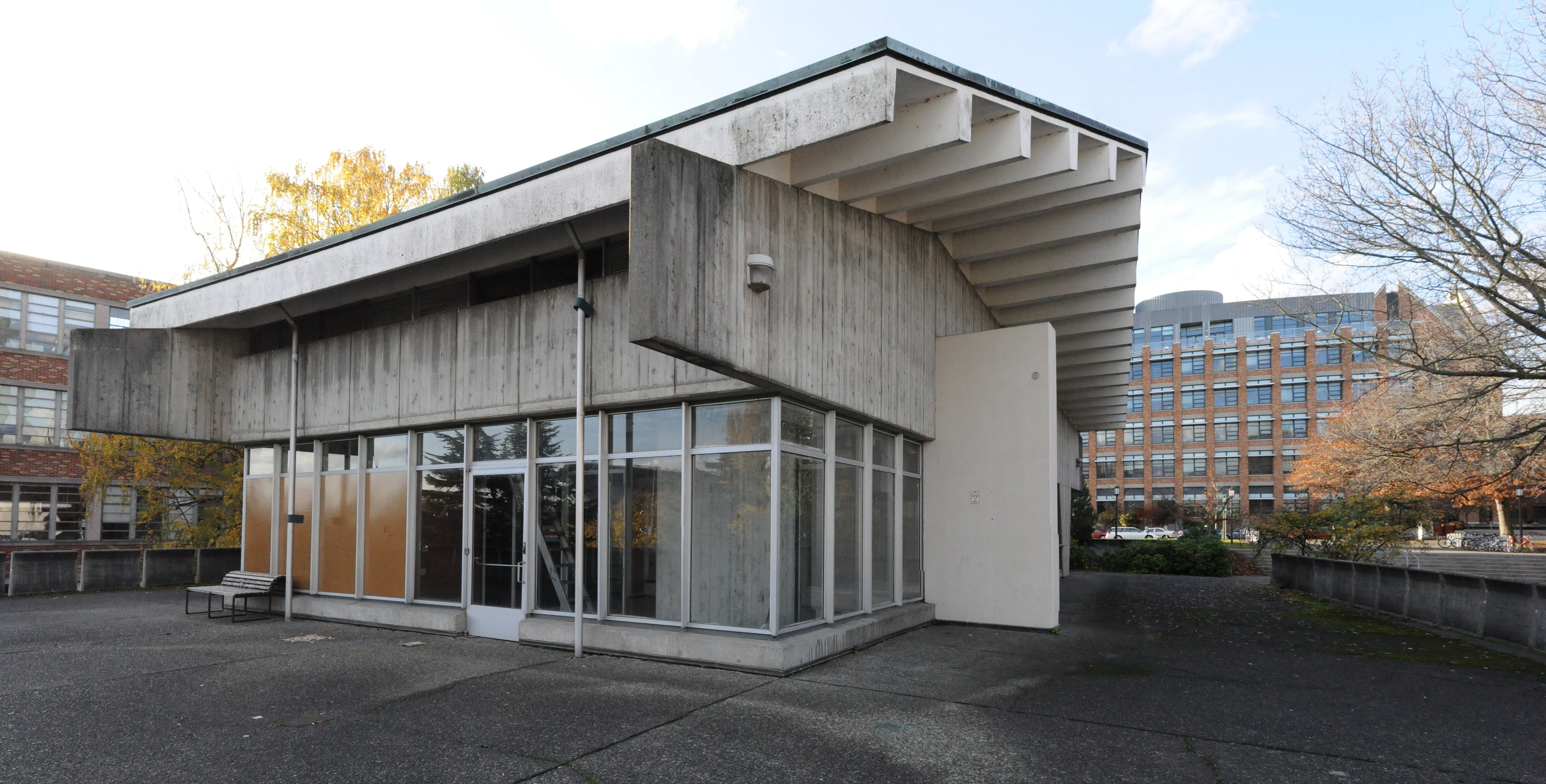
- The decommissioned More Hall Annex, photographed in 2009
- Interactive map of the More Hall Annex area
- Former names: Nuclear Reactor Building (1961–2001)

General information
- Type: Nuclear research reactor
- Architectural style: Brutalist
- Location: 3785 Jefferson Road NE; Seattle, Washington
- Opened: April 10, 1961
- Inaugurated: June 1, 1961
- Closed: June 30, 1988
- Demolished: July 19, 2016
- Owner: University of Washington

Dimensions
- Other dimensions: 69 ft 8 in by 76 ft (21.23 m by 23 m)

Technical details
- Material: Reinforced concrete
- Size: 7,595 sq ft (705.6 m^{2})
- Floor count: 2

Design and construction
- Architecture firm: The Architect Artist Group
- Designations: NRHP, WSHR
- Nuclear Reactor Building
- U.S. National Register of Historic Places
- Location within Washington (state)
- Location: Seattle, Washington
- Coordinates: 47°39′10″N 122°18′16″W
- Built: 1961
- Architectural style: Brutalist
- NRHP reference No.: 08001158
- Added to NRHP: July 24, 2009

Nuclear Reactor Building
- Operating institution: University of Washington
- Location: Seattle, Washington
- Type: Argonaut class reactor
- Power: 100 kW (thermal)

Construction and upkeep
- First criticality: 1961
- Shutdown date: 1988
- Decommission date: 2007

Technical specifications
- Fuel type: Uranium-235

The More Hall Annex, formerly the Nuclear Reactor Building, was a building on the campus of the University of Washington (UW) in Seattle, Washington, United States, that once housed a functional nuclear research reactor. It was inaugurated in 1961 and shut down in 1988, operating at a peak of 100 kilowatts thermal (kWt), and was officially decommissioned in 2007.

The reactor was housed in a reinforced concrete building designed in the Brutalist architectural style by UW faculty members. They designed the reactor room with large windows that allowed observation from the outside, in an attempt to demonstrate the safety of nuclear energy.

The Nuclear Reactor Building was added to the National Register of Historic Places in 2009, after a campaign led by an architecture student in response to the proposed demolition of the building. A later demolition plan prompted a lawsuit from preservation groups, which ended with a court ruling exempting the building from the city's landmarks-preservation ordinance. While this decision was eventually overturned, the university demolished the building in July 2016 and replaced it with a new computer science building that opened in February 2019.

== Design and functions ==
The building housed an Argonaut class reactor with an initial output of 10 kilowatts thermal (kWt), later increased to 100 kWt in 1967. It used uranium-235 as fuel and was cooled by water. The reactor's chamber, placed on the lower floor of the facility, was 15 ft (4.6 m) high, 20 ft (6.1 m) long, and 19 ft (5.8 m) wide. During its 27-year lifespan, the reactor operated for the equivalent of 140 days, running for some days at half power and for as little as 10 minutes.

The More Hall Annex was a two-story, reinforced concrete structure designed in the Brutalist style, similar to other buildings on the university campus built during the post-war era. It occupied a footprint of 69 ft 8 in (21.23 m) from north to south and 76 ft (23 m) from east to west, with a total of 7,595 square feet (705.6 m^{2}) of interior space. The building was designed by a consortium of UW faculty members, known as The Architect Artist Group (TAAG), with input from nuclear engineering department chair Albert L. Babb. Babb requested a building that would "show the world what nuclear power looked like", desiring a prominent structure on the campus that would serve as a crown jewel for the department. The large glass walls enabled public viewing of the reactor room's interior, showcasing the activity inside.

The first floor, partly covered by the outdoor plaza, housed the reactor, laboratory, crystal spectrometer, counting room with a nuclear densometer, classrooms, restrooms, and offices. The second floor contained the control room, an observatory, and a lecture room overlooking the reactor; it was open to the outdoor plaza on three sides, with large glass windows allowing for public observation of experiments. The reactor was placed on the lower side of the building, downhill of the plaza, to allow the ground to absorb accidental radiation leaks. The structure's roof rested on a series of perpendicular beams that also supported a three-ton (2,700 kg) crane used to lift the reactor shield between experiments.

== History ==
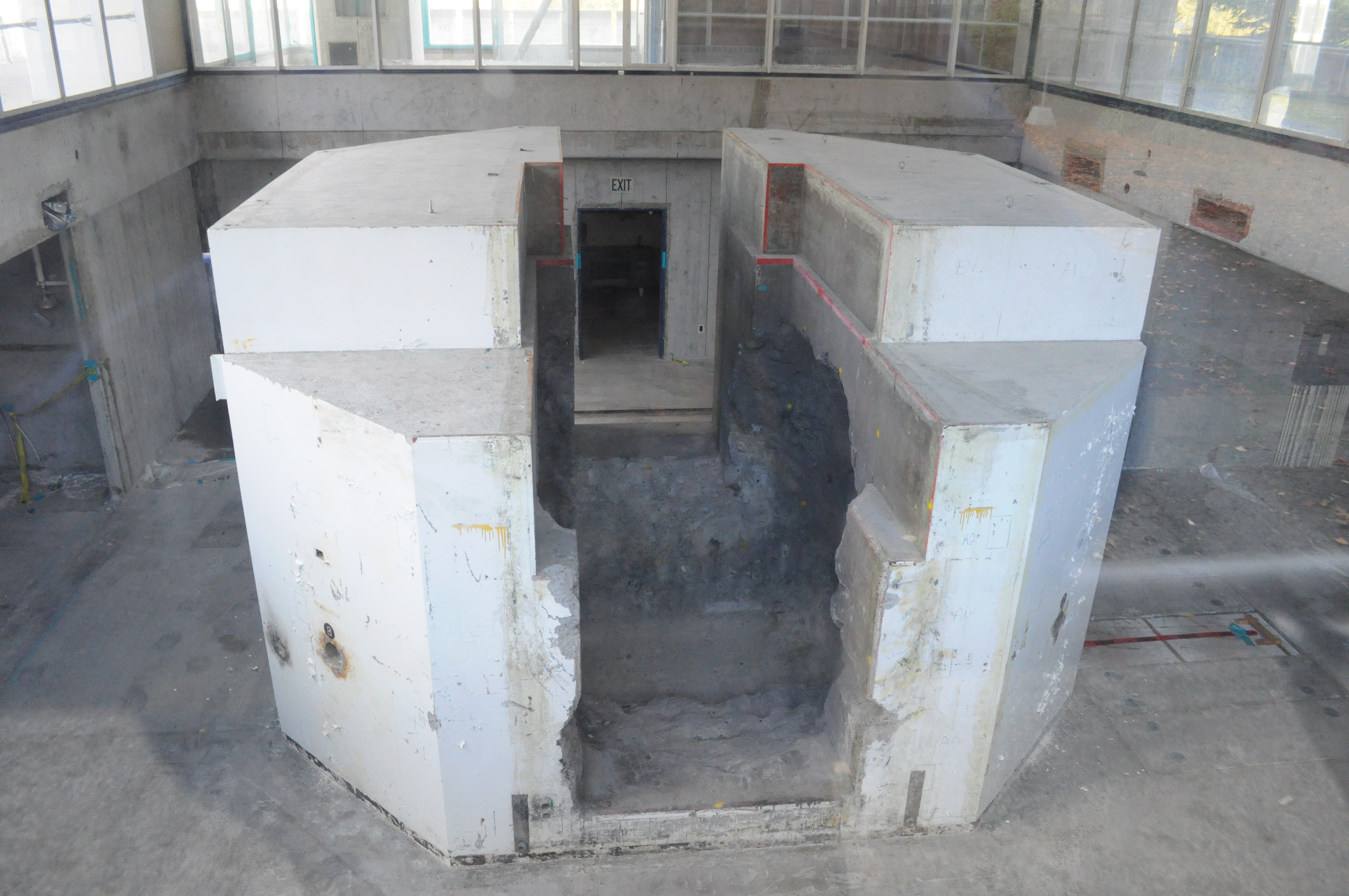
Interior of the decommissioned reactor room, photographed in 2009

During the late 1950s and 1960s, the Atomic Energy Commission (AEC) provided universities and colleges with grants to acquire small nuclear reactors for research programs. The University of Washington began nuclear engineering classes as part of the College of Engineering in 1953 and formed a Department of Nuclear Engineering in 1956, accepting engineers from Boeing and the nearby Hanford Site as its first students. The Nuclear Engineering department used training reactors at Bagley Hall and later proposed that the university acquire a nuclear reactor to be installed on campus. In 1957, the AEC approved $100,000 in funding (equivalent to $851,000 in 2024 dollars) for the University of Washington to install a permanent nuclear reactor on the campus, the first of its kind in the United States.

The proposed 10 kW reactor was approved by the university's Board of Regents in April 1959, to be housed in a two-story reinforced concrete building with offices, workshops, a control room, and class and seminar spaces. The building was designed by TAAG architects Wendell Lovett, Gene Zema and Daniel Streissguth, all members of the UW faculty. In December, the regents awarded the construction contract to Jentoft & Forbes, paying $308,082 (equivalent to $2.53 million in 2024 dollars) for the project. A site at the eastern edge of the campus was chosen for its proximity to various academic engineering buildings and its visibility to the public.

The AEC granted an operating license for the reactor to the university in April 1961, and the reactor began operating with a self-sustained nuclear reaction on April 10. It was officially dedicated on June 1, in a ceremony attended by Argonne National Laboratory director Norman Hilberry, a physicist who worked on Chicago Pile-1, the world's first nuclear reactor to achieve criticality. During the 1962 World's Fair, hosted by the city at the Seattle Center, the reactor became the subject of group tours from professional organizations.

Throughout the 1960s, the reactor was used for medical research by the university's School of Medicine and local hospitals, with a staff of six full-time employees and four part-time staff (most of whom were students who worked for the U.S. Navy's nuclear programs). In 1966, the university and local law enforcement agencies proposed converting the reactor into a part-time laboratory for forensic science. By 1975, the reactor had only used 10 grams (0.35 oz) of its 3,300 g (120 oz) of uranium-235 fuel.

=== 1972 plutonium spill ===
On June 13, 1972, during an experiment that used a plutonium sample, three lab workers were exposed to radiation after a capsule holding the sample spilled, requiring a full investigation of the nuclear reactor. One of the workers, graduate student W. Robert Sloan, was exposed to 42 milligrams (0.65 gr) of plutonium dust and drove to a laboratory in Richland to be tested for radiation, but was found to have not been significantly contaminated. The spill was later linked to vibrations in the capsule holding the sample, and workers credited good design and careful handling in avoiding a larger incident. A visiting class of schoolchildren from Montana, observing the reactor from the outside, were unaffected by the accident. After an inspection by teams from the Hanford Site, the lab was cleaned and wiped down while periodic radiation checks were performed. Contaminated materials were sanitized with a liquid freon solution and disposed of; the clean-up cost a total of $30,000 in emergency funds (equivalent to $170,000 in 2024 dollars).

The university was cited by the AEC for violations of its reactor-operating license in connection with the incident, but none in direct connection to the immediate cause. The incident resulted in an investigation by the Nuclear Reactor Advisory Committee into its review processes for reactor experiments, after the AEC determined there was inadequate review of the UW experiment. The staff members were praised by the AEC for protecting the public by sealing the materials and evacuating the building for six hours.

=== Shutdown and decommissioning ===
In the late 1970s, development of nuclear power in the United States slowed to a halt, as new plants were cancelled or put on hold. The 1983 financial collapse of the Washington Public Power Supply System, a government agency planning to build five large nuclear power plants throughout the state, and the Three Mile Island accident of 1979 both contributed to a decline in interest in the university's nuclear program. Student use of the reactor was replaced by commercial use to produce nuclear isotopes for medical use. By 1988, the enrollment in UW's nuclear engineering program had shrunk to 23 students, and the program was cancelled entirely in 1992.

The reactor was shut down on June 30, 1988, following a Nuclear Regulatory Commission (NRC) mandate to convert research reactors to lower-grade fuel, or shut them down entirely, after fears of possible terrorist access. The remaining 4 kilograms (8.8 lb) of enriched uranium fuel rods were transported to Idaho for processing and disposal. The building provided offices and storage space for various UW departments, including the College of Engineering's robotics laboratory. The University of Washington applied to the NRC to dismantle the reactor on August 2, 1994.

In the wake of the September 11, 2001 attacks, the Nuclear Reactor Building was renamed to the More Hall Annex to deter burglary, after a request from the NRC. Formal decommissioning of the site, including a $4 million cleanup (equivalent to $5.97 million in 2024 dollars), began in April 2006, amid student protests over the contractor hired for the work. The NRC formally terminated the university's license to operate the reactor in May 2007.

=== Preservation attempts ===
Prior to the removal of the reactor in October 2008, the university proposed demolishing the structure and redeveloping the site for other uses. The plan was stopped after the reactor building was placed on the Washington Heritage Register, the state's list of historic buildings, a designation that was contested by the University of Washington. Preservationists suggested re-using the building as a museum dedicated to the state's nuclear history and continuing research. The structure was added to the National Register of Historic Places in 2009, based on an application submitted by Abby Inpanbutr (née Martin), a UW architecture student, in spring 2008.

The university again proposed demolition of the structure in 2015, to clear the space for a new computer science building adjacent to the existing Paul G. Allen School of Computer Science & Engineering. In May 2015, the More Hall Annex was named one of Washington's "most endangered historic properties" by the Washington Trust for Historic Preservation, which cited its place as an early Brutalist work to justify its preservation.

The university released a draft supplemental environmental impact statement (SEIS) for the project in October 2015, recommending the demolition of the More Hall Annex in their preferred alternative. In response to the SEIS, building conservation group Docomomo WEWA nominated the More Hall Annex for city landmark status on December 2. The University of Washington filed a lawsuit against the City of Seattle and Docomomo on December 18 over the landmark nomination and whether the city could enforce its landmark preservation laws on state-owned property.

The King County Superior Court ruled in April that the university was exempt from the city's landmarks-preservation ordinance and could go ahead with demolition of the More Hall Annex. While the city and preservationists appealed the decision, they allowed the demolition of the More Hall Annex to proceed by not seeking a stay that would leave them responsible for damages compensation. The decision was appealed to the Washington Supreme Court, which ruled in the city's favor and rejected the university's claimed exemption from the city landmarks preservation ordinance.

=== Demolition ===
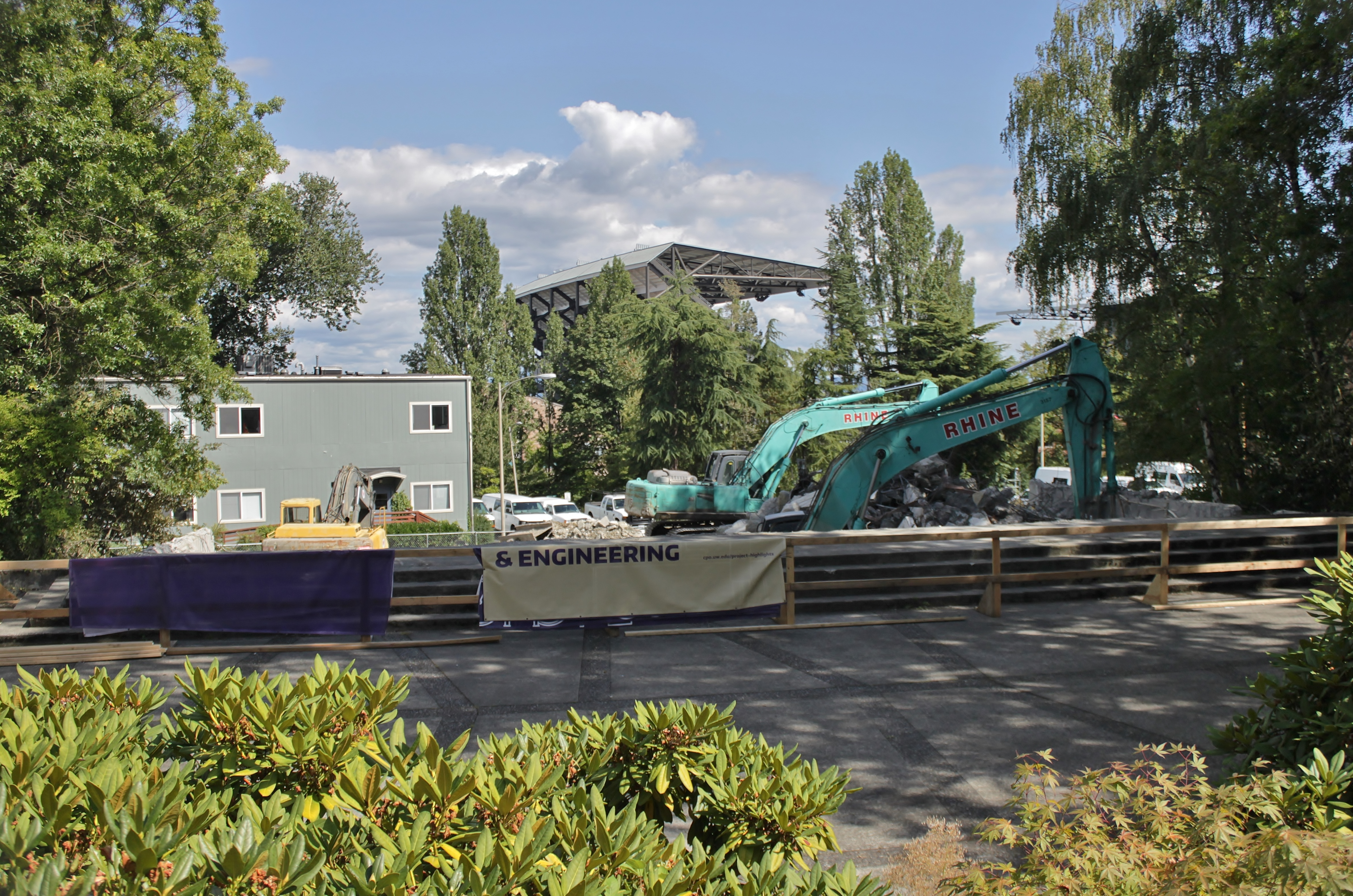
Demolition work on the site of More Hall Annex in late July 2016

On February 11, 2016, the UW Board of Regents approved a site plan that would demolish the More Hall Annex to allow for the construction of the new computer science center, to open in 2019. An attempt to incorporate elements of the nuclear reactor into the new computer science building was rejected because of the impact of potential seismic retrofits that would be required to meet modern standards. The computer science department instead plans to make a virtual tour of the building available online in a digital archive.

After the decision by the King County Superior Court to exempt the building from city preservation ordinances, the university applied for a demolition permit in May 2016. Demolition of the More Hall Annex began on July 19, and preservationists held a mock funeral for the building with Daniel Streissguth, one of the project's original architects.

=== Replacement ===
The More Hall Annex was replaced by the Bill & Melinda Gates Center for Computer Science & Engineering, which houses part of the university's computer science program. The 130,000-square-foot (12,000 m^{2}) building includes a 250-person lecture hall, classrooms, and lab spaces for robotics and other technologies. In January 2017, the Board of Regents approved its construction, which began later in the year. The building was topped out in December 2017, roughly marking the halfway point in construction. The Bill & Melinda Gates Center was opened to students on February 28, 2019.
