= Salaspils Research Reactor =

Former research reactor in Latvia

The Salaspils Research Reactor (Latvian: Salaspils kodolreaktors) is a former pool-type research reactor in Salaspils, Latvia. It was built for the Institute of Physics of the Latvian Academy of Sciences and operated from 26 September 1961 to 19 June 1998. Research at the reactor covered nuclear physics, radiation chemistry and radiobiology.

The facility was partly dismantled after its closure, but decommissioning was still in progress in August 2025.

== Establishment and research ==
The Soviet government authorised construction of the reactor in 1958. It was based on the IRT design developed at the Institute of Atomic Energy in Moscow. The reactor first reached criticality on 26 September 1961. Reconstruction in the mid-1970s increased its thermal power to 5 MW.

Alongside research in nuclear physics, radiation chemistry and radiobiology, the reactor was used to develop radiation dosimeters and produce radioactive preparations for medical use. Latvian scientists also developed a radiation loop that supplied gamma rays for irradiation experiments and work on industrial irradiation processes.

The reactor provided training for specialists from North Korea, Iraq and Libya, which had acquired IRT reactors from the Soviet Union.

== Closure and decommissioning ==
In May 1995, the Latvian government ordered preparations to dismantle the reactor and prohibited further purchases of nuclear fuel. The reactor shut down permanently on 19 June 1998. The government approved a decommissioning plan on 26 October 1999 and revised it in 2004.

Unused nuclear fuel was returned to Russia in 2005, followed by the spent fuel in 2008. By 2019, the reactor had been partly dismantled and was awaiting final decommissioning, according to the International Atomic Energy Agency.

Funding shortages and the need for additional capacity at the Radons radioactive waste repository near Baldone delayed completion of the dismantling work. Decommissioning remained in progress in August 2025, when Latvia's radiation regulator reported delays in completing the dismantling design.
