= Reactor operator =

Person who controls a nuclear reactor

Reactor Operator
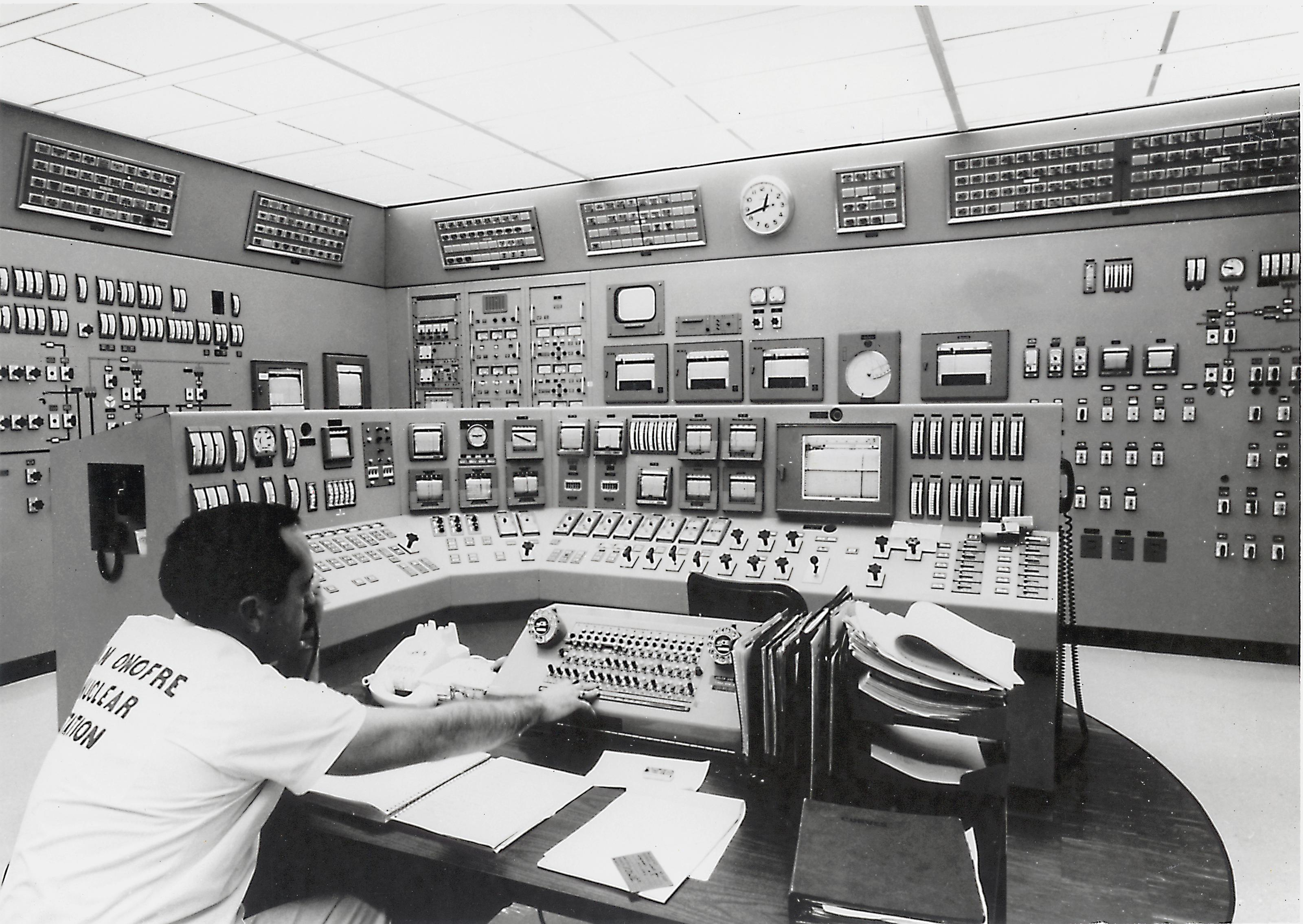
- The control room of San Onofre Nuclear Generating Station c. 1968.

Occupation
- Synonyms: Nuclear reactor operator, RO
- Occupation type: Profession/military
- Activity sectors: Military/power/science

Description
- Competencies: Neutronics, regulatory compliance, maintenance, emergency response
- Education required: Varies
- Fields of employment: Nuclear industry, nuclear navy

A reactor operator (or nuclear reactor operator) is an individual at a nuclear power plant or other nuclear reactor who is responsible for directly controlling the reactor core. This is typically done using control rods, aided by information from other instruments, such as neutron detectors, thermometers, and radiation detectors.

In addition to controlling the reactor core, the responsibilities of reactor operators may include control of other important reactor equipment, logging and recording of reactor activities, monitoring of reactor parameters, response to adverse or unexpected reactor conditions, maintenance and care of equipment, and emergency preparedness and response. As they are responsible for manipulation of the control rods, reactor operators are the only individuals at a reactor who can significantly alter amounts of core reactivity.

All reactor operators are required to be licensed or qualified by their respective governing body (for example, the Nuclear Regulatory Commission for U.S. civilian nuclear reactors and Naval Reactors for U.S. naval reactors). Because of the risk of catastrophic consequences from incidents in reactor cores, reactor operators are often subject to stringent mental and physical health requirements.

== History ==
=== Origins and early operators (1942-1950s) ===
The history of reactor operators began with the first artificial nuclear reactor, Chicago Pile-1. Although the experimenters there lacked any formal system of certifications in nuclear operations, physicist George Weil arguably became the first reactor operator, as he was responsible for the physical movement of the control rods. Reactors, for both research and plutonium production, proliferated, both across the United States and the other burgeoning nuclear powers. The US Navy founded its Naval Reactors branch in 1949, which would become one if not the first organization to train reactor operators as such, rather than leaving reactor operations in the hands of nuclear scientists and engineers. In 1953, President Dwight Eisenhower's famous Atoms for Peace speech at the United Nations emphasized the need for peaceful uses of nuclear technology. The first nuclear-powered submarine, the USS Nautilus, was put to sea in 1954. The Obninsk Nuclear Power Plant, the first nuclear power plant, began operating later that same year. Calder Hall, the first commercial nuclear power plant, began operating in the UK two years later.

The US Navy founded its first nuclear power school in New London in 1956. Within three years, the school trained more than 1100 men, but the requirements of the fleet - estimated at around 2300 new naval nuclear personnel each year - soon necessitated the opening of new schools at Mare Island in 1959 and Bainbridge in 1962. Courses for enlisted men covered elementary calculus, basic physics, reactor and electrical theory, thermodynamics, nuclear plant systems, chemistry, metallurgy, and health physics. Those for officers covered advanced calculus, nuclear physics, reactor theory and engineering, chemistry and metallurgy, servomechanisms and control, and nuclear plant systems. Training at these schools was grueling, with fifteen-hour study days and attrition rates as high as 10%. Admiral Rickover, director of Naval Reactors, said of nuclear power school that "in this school the smartest work as hard as those who must struggle to pass."

=== Development of regulatory framework (1950s-1970s) ===
These reactors continued to be operated by scientists, technicians, and engineers trained on the job, without any centralized national oversight. In the 1950s, many of these programs were brought under the regulation of national bodies, such as the Atomic Energy Commission (AEC), United Kingdom Atomic Energy Authority (UKAEA), Japanese Atomic Energy Commission, and the Ministry of Medium Machine-Building. This increasing centralization was not without some opposition, as in the United States, where AEC chairman Lewis Strauss argued against the AEC having the power to regulate reactor operator selection. Nevertheless, in 1955 it required operators to pass a test and a medical examination in order to be licensed to operate.

=== Regulatory tightening after accidents (1970s–1980s) ===
Following the Three Mile Island accident and heated debate on new operator regulations, in 1984 the Nuclear Regulatory Commission (successor to the AEC), approved the nuclear industry's proposals to require prospective operators to have combinations of college education, service in the nuclear Navy, training on simulators, and operating experience. The next year, it published Training and Qualification of Nuclear Power Plant Personnel, which endorsed the Institute of Nuclear Power Operations's program for operator training.

In 1987, the NRC shut down the Peach Bottom reactors after discovering operators had been sleeping, playing video games, and reading magazines while on duty. INPO claimed this was indicative not of failures in regulation but of a lack of professionalism among operators.

== United States ==
In the United States, the 2024 median annual salary for a licensed reactor operator was $122,610. The Bureau of Labor Statistics predicts a 15% decline in reactor operator jobs from 2024 to 2034.

There are two types of civilian reactor operators licensed by the NRC: reactor operators (RO) and senior reactor operators (SRO). A reactor operator is licensed to manipulate the controls of a reactor (which may alter reactivity and therefore change the power level) while a senior reactor operator may both manipulate controls and direct the activities of reactor operators. Typically, this means that an RO or SRO is qualified to remotely operate control rods and other remote actions required to control the reactor as desired.

In addition, a senior reactor operator is the senior watch stander in a control room and is responsible for directing the operation of the nuclear reactor as desired. They also may be authorized to direct fuel movement/core alterations within the reactor vessel.

A senior reactor operator (like pilots in command and masters of ships at sea) is authorized by law to depart from regulations during emergencies. 10CFR50.54 (x) and (y) state that reactors may violate the conditions of their license or technical specifications in an emergency when no other option is apparent to protect public health & safety. However, they also require that such actions be approved by a senior reactor operator.

=== Civilian reactor operator license requirements ===
==== Reactor operator ====
A reactor operator is an individual who has met the licensing requirements of 10CFR55 and NUREG-1021 for being a reactor operator. For reactor operators at power reactors, these requirements include:

- a high school diploma
- at least 3 years of power plant experience with at least 1 year of experience at the nuclear power plant where the individual is licensed (not including time spent as a control room operator)
- at least 6 months of experience performing plant operational duties at the nuclear power plant where the individual is licensed
- at least 3 months of experience as a control room operator at the nuclear power plant where the individual is licensed
- completion of the nuclear power plant's reactor operator training program
- supervised manipulation of the controls of the nuclear reactor for certain operations affecting reactor power level
- a successful medical examination meeting NRC requirements
- passing the NRC Generic Fundamentals Examination
- passing the nuclear power plant's reactor operator test
- passing the nuclear power plant's Operating Test (approved by the NRC) which covers knowledge of the nuclear power plant components, knowledge of casualty response, and responses to simulated casualties and plant evolutions in an approved simulator.

==== Senior reactor operator ====
A senior reactor operator is an individual who has met the licensing requirements of 10CFR55 and NUREG-1021 for being a senior reactor operator. These requirements are similar to the requirements for a reactor operator, except:

- at least 3 years of site specific nuclear power plant experience is required instead of 3 years of general power plant experience
- a bachelor's degree in engineering, engineering technology, or physical science is required unless the operator has had 1 year of experience as a licensed reactor operator or 2 years of experience qualified in certain senior watch stations in the Naval Nuclear Propulsion Program (including that of a naval reactor operator)
- fulfilling certain supervisory functions as a trainee
- completion of the nuclear power plant's senior reactor operator training program
- passing the nuclear power plant's senior reactor operator test which includes an administrative section in addition to the reactor operator test
- passing a more extensive plant Operating Test which also includes supervisory and administrative actions.

Again, these requirements apply only to staff at power reactors.

==== Trainee ====
The only other person who may manipulate the controls of a US civilian nuclear reactor is an individual who:

- Is under the direction and in the presence of a licensed operator or senior operator and
- Manipulates the controls of a facility as a part of the individual's training for an operator license (or, at research and test reactors, a student doing so as part of their studies)
- Is enrolled in the facility licensee's training program as approved by the Commission to qualify for an operator license under 10CFR55.

== Europe ==
The European Atomic Energy Community provides a regulatory framework for reactor operators through Council Directive 2009/71/Euratom. Article 7 requires Member States to ensure that their national legislative framework provides for appropriate education and training arrangements for personnel whose duties require nuclear safety-related competencies.
