= History of Queen Mary University of London =

Coat of arms of Queen Mary University of London

The history of Queen Mary University of London lies in the mergers, over the years, of four older colleges: Queen Mary College, Westfield College, St Bartholomew's Hospital Medical College and the London Hospital Medical College. In 1989 Queen Mary merged with Westfield College to form "Queen Mary & Westfield College". Although teaching began at the London Hospital Medical College in 1785, it did not become part of Queen Mary until 1995. In that same year the two medical schools merged to form the School of Medicine and Dentistry at Queen Mary & Westfield College.

In 2000, the college adopted the working title of Queen Mary, University of London, while retaining the legal name Queen Mary and Westfield College. In 2013 the legal name of the institution was changed to Queen Mary University of London.

== People's Palace ==
Queen Mary College was founded in the mid Victorian era when growing awareness of conditions in London's East End led to drives to provide facilities for local inhabitants, popularised in the 1882 novel All Sorts of Conditions of Men – An Impossible Story by Walter Besant, which told of how a rich and clever couple from Mayfair went to the East End to build a "Palace of Delight, with concert halls, reading rooms, picture galleries, art and designing schools." Although not directly responsible for the conception of the People's Palace, the novel did much to popularise it.

The trustees of the Beaumont Trust, administering funds left by Barber Beaumont, purchased the site of the former Bancroft's School from the Drapers' Company. On 20 May 1885 the Drapers' Court of Assistants resolved to grant £20,000 "for the provision of the technical schools of the People's Palace." The foundation stone was laid on 28 June 1886 and on 14 May 1887 Queen Victoria opened the palace's Queen's Hall as well as laying the foundation stone for the technical schools in the palace's east wing.

The technical schools were opened on 5 October 1888, with the entire palace completed by 1892. When opening them, the Master of the Drapers' Company declared their aims to be "to improve the scientific and technical knowledge of apprentices and workmen engaged in industrial life". However others saw the technical schools as one day becoming a technical university for the East End. The conflicting demands of pleasure and education were identified by the Assistant Charity Commissioner as early as 1891 and for the next forty years this was to dog the People's Palace. In 1892 the Drapers' Company provided £7,000 a year for ten years to guarantee the educational side income.

== East London College ==
=== Expansion ===
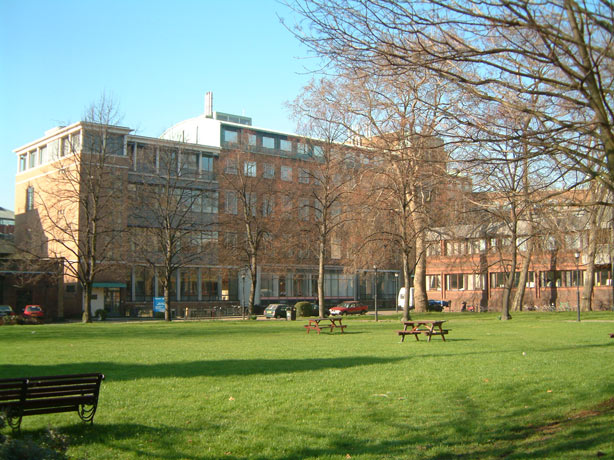
Part of the Charterhouse Square site

The classes reached a peak of 8000 tickets in 1892–1893 but fell to less than half for the following year, due to competition from the London School Board, despite the palace's classes being more advanced. With the level of teaching growing, in 1895 John Leigh Smeathman Hatton, Director of Evening Classes (1892–1896; later Director of Studies 1896–1908 and Principal 1908–1933), proposed introducing a course of study leading to the Bachelor of Science degree of the University of London. By the start of the 20th century the first degrees were awarded and Hatton, along with several other professors, were recognised as teachers of the University of London. In 1906 an application for parliamentary funds "for the aid of Educational Institutions engaged in work of a University nature", led to the college being told it was "of the highest importance that there should be a School of the University in the faculties of Arts, Science and Engineering within easy reach of the very large population of the East End of London." The educational part of the People's Palace was admitted on an initial three-year trial basis as a school of the University of London on 15 May 1907 as East London College.

=== Aeronautics ===
The ground-breaking wind tunnel built in the first ever Aeronautical department in the UK.

Teaching of aeronautical engineering began in 1907 which led to the first UK aeronautical engineering department being established in 1909 which boasted a ground-breaking wind tunnel, thus creating the oldest aeronautical programme in the world. A. P. Thurston, a former student at the college gaining a first class degree in Mechanical and Electrical Engineering in 1906, was encouraged and financially supported by P. Y. Alexander, a wealthy aeronautical enthusiast and acquaintance, and J. L. Hatton, the then principal, to start regular courses of lectures in aeronautics. Thurston gradually brought in more and more skilled aeronautical engineers, and with the newly built laboratory, started giving lectures in aeronautics ("Flying machines", "Balloons, airships and kites", "The mechanical principles of flight") and started extensive research on fundamental matters such as the characteristics of wing sections and propellers, structural and material characteristics, and the forces on struts, leading to use in military aircraft for the First World War.

=== 1910 to 1934 ===
In 1910 the college's status in the University of London was extended for a further five years, with unlimited membership achieved in May 1915. During this period the organisation of the governors of the People's Palace was rearranged, creating the separate People's Palace Committee and East London College Committee, both under the palace governors, as a sign of the growing separation of the two concepts within a single complex.

During the First World War the college admitted students from the London Hospital Medical College who were preparing for the preliminary medical examination, the first step in a long process that would eventually bring the two institutions together. After the war, the college grew, albeit constrained by the rest of the People's Palace to the west and a burial ground immediately to the east. In 1920 it obtained both the palace's Rotunda (now the Octagon) and rooms under the winter gardens at the west of the palace, which became chemical laboratories. The college's status was also unique, being the only School of the University of London that was subject to both the Charity Commissioners and the Board of Education. In April 1929 the College Council decided it would take the steps towards applying to the Privy Council for a royal charter, but on the advice of the Drapers' Company first devised a scheme for development and expansion, which recommended amongst other things to reamalgamate the People's Palace and the college, with guaranteed provision of the Queen's Hall for recreational purposes, offering at least freedom of governance if not in space.

== Queen Mary College ==
=== Granting of the royal charter ===
In the early hours of 25 February 1931 a fire destroyed the Queen's Hall, although both the college and the winter gardens escaped. In the coming days discussions on reconstruction led to the proposal that the entire site be transferred to the college which would then apply for a charter alone. The Drapers' Company obtained St Helen's Terrace, a row of six houses neighbouring the site, and in July 1931 it was agreed to give these over to the People's Palace for a new site adjacent to the old, which would now become entirely the domain of the college. Separation was now achieved. The charter was now pursued, but the Academic Board asked for a name change, feeling that "east London" carried unfortunate associations that would hinder the college and its graduates. With the initial proposed name, "Queen's College", having already been taken by another institution and "Victoria College" felt to be unoriginal, "Queen Mary College" was settled on. The charter of incorporation was presented on 12 December 1934 by Queen Mary herself.

=== Second World War and Post-War period ===
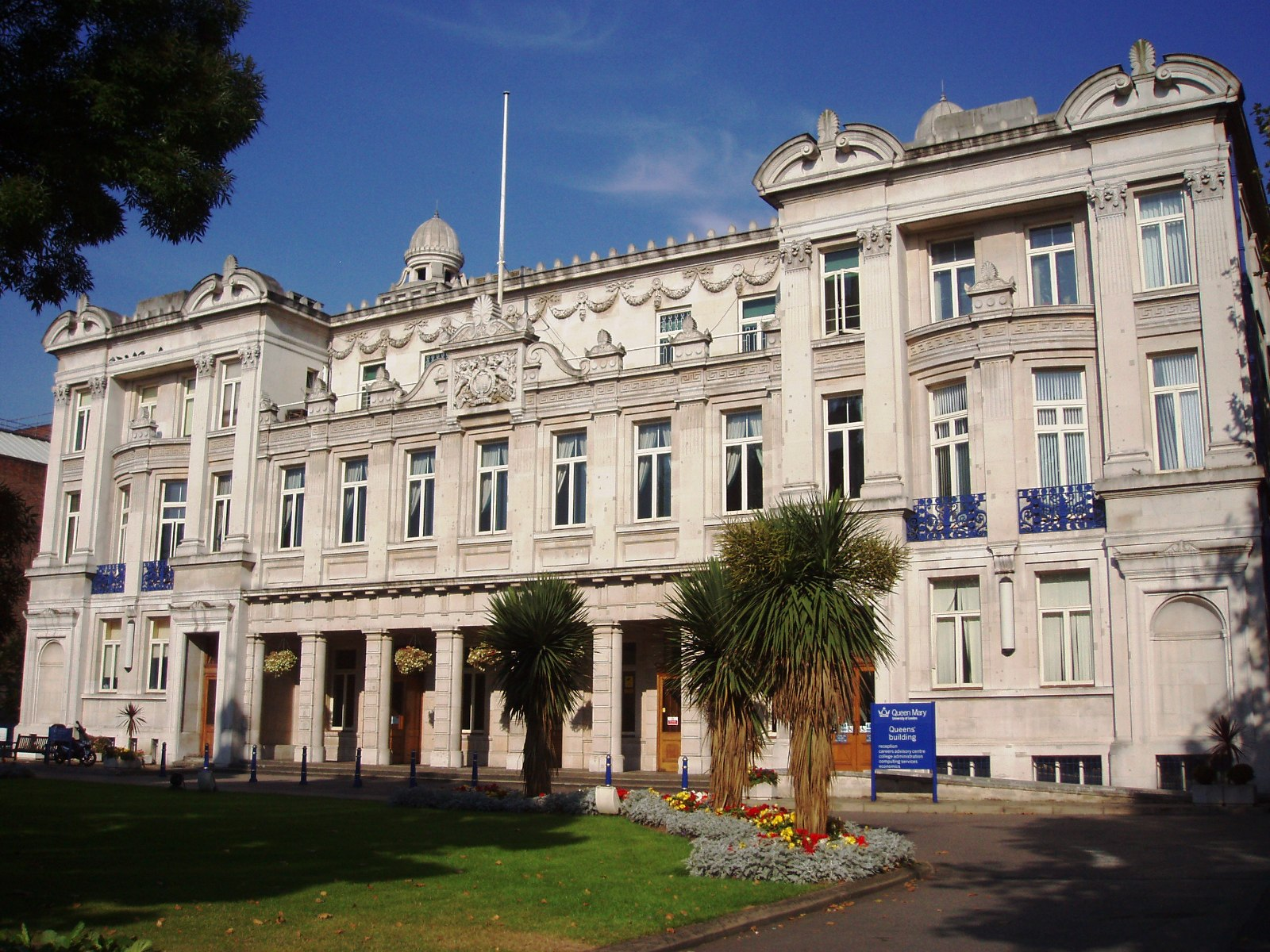
The Queens' Building

During the Second World War the college was evacuated to Cambridge, where it shared with King's College. Meanwhile, the Mile End site was requisitioned for war work and was for a time used as the Municipal Offices of Stepney Borough Council. After the war the college returned to London, facing many of the same problems but with prospects for westward expansion.

The East End had suffered considerable bomb damage (although the college itself had incurred little) and consequently several areas of land near to the college site now became vacant. The former church of St Benets' to the immediate east of the college was now defunct and was demolished in 1950, with the space used to build a new block for physics, but most of the acquisitions in the immediate post war years were to the west of the college. Even the new People's Palace was no longer able to meet its needs and it was acquired by the college along with several pieces of land that together formed a significant continuous stretch along the Mile End Road. New buildings for engineering, biology and chemistry were built on the new sites, whilst the arts took over the space vacated in the original building, now renamed the Queens' Building (to reflect the support and patronage of both Queen Mary and Queen Elizabeth the Queen Mother).

Limited accommodation resulted in the acquisition of further land in South Woodford (now directly connected to Mile End tube station by means of the Central line's eastward extension), upon which tower blocks were established. Consequently, student numbers continued to expand. The college also obtained the Co-operative Wholesale Society's clothing factory on the Mile End Road which was converted into a building for the Faculty of Laws (and some other teaching), as well as the former headquarters of Spratt's Patent Ltd (operators of the "largest dog biscuit factory in the world" – see Spratt's Complex) at 41–47 Bow Road, which was converted into a building for the Faculty of Economics founded by Maurice Peston, Baron Peston. Both faculties were physically separated from what was now a campus to the west.

From the mid-1960s until the mid-1980s the college was in a period of uncertainty and flux. Much planning was dominated by the "BLQ scheme" which proposed to link Queen Mary College with the London Hospital Medical College and St Bartholomew's Hospital Medical College with a joint facility in Mile End, but the land was not yet available. Over the period land that came onto the market was purchased with the intention to consolidate as soon as possible. The Queen Mary College Act 1973 was passed "to authorise the disposal of the Nuevo burial ground in the London Borough of Tower Hamlets and to authorise the use for other purposes thereof..." and gave the authority to disinter and reinter most of the graves to Dytchleys. A further link with both The London and St. Bartholomew's was made in 1974 when an anonymous donor provided for the establishment of a further hall of residence in Woodford, to be divided equally between Queen Mary College students and the two medical colleges.

=== Nuclear reactor ===
Queen Mary was home to a nuclear reactor from 1964 to 1982.

From 1964 until 1982 QMC maintained a nuclear reactor, the first to be built for a UK university. A reactor was commissioned on the Mile End site beneath Mile End Road and operated from around 1964 to 1966 at around 1 kW. This reactor was the brainchild of the first Professor of Nuclear Engineering, Walter Murgatroyd, and was managed by John Shaw. The reactor was purchased from de Havilland. In 1966 it was decommissioned and a new 100 kW Argonaut class reactor was built at the new QMC Nucleonics Laboratory in Marshgate Lane, Stratford, London, upgraded in 1968, and decommissioned in 1982, with the site licence surrendered in November 1983. The Marshgate Lane site became part of the Olympic Park from 2006; in response to safety concerns about the former purpose of the site, a Greenpeace spokesman was quoted as saying "In our view there's nothing to worry about."

=== 1980 to 1989 ===
At the start of the 1980s changing demographics and finances caused much concern through the university sector and led to a reorganisation of the University of London. At Queen Mary some subjects, such as Russian and Classics were discontinued, whilst the college became one of five in the university with a concentration of laboratory sciences, including the transfer of science departments from Westfield College, Chelsea College, Queen Elizabeth College and Bedford College.

From the mid-1980s onwards the college began expanding across the newly acquired land to the east, taking the campus to the Regent's Canal. A part of the burial ground remains to this day, but the rest of the area has been absorbed by the college's expansion. The long-planned Pre-Clinical Medicine building for the BLQ Scheme finally materialised in the late 1980s, further strengthening the ties between the three colleges.

== 1989 to 2010 ==
In 1989 Queen Mary College (informally known as QMC) merged with Westfield College to form Queen Mary & Westfield College (often abbreviated to QMW). Over subsequent years, activities were concentrated on the Queen Mary site, with the Westfield site eventually sold.

In 1990, the London Hospital was renamed the Royal London Hospital, after marking its 250th year, and a reorganisation of medical education within the University of London resulted in most of the freestanding medical schools being merged with existing large colleges to form multi-faculty institutions. In 1995 the London Hospital Medical College and St Bartholomew's Hospital Medical College merged into Queen Mary & Westfield College to form the entity now named Barts and The London School of Medicine and Dentistry.

In 2000 the college changed its name for general public use to Queen Mary, University of London; in 2013, the college legally changed its name to Queen Mary University of London.

The VISTA telescope is a 4-metre class wide-field telescope at the Paranal Observatory in Chile that was conceived and developed by Queen Mary University, costing approximately £36m.

The Westfield Student Village opened in 2004 on the Mile End Campus, bringing over 2,000 rooms to students and a huge array of facilities, restaurants, and cafes.

The Blizard Building, home to the Medical School's Institute of Cell and Molecular Science opened at the Whitechapel campus in 2005. The award-winning building was designed by Will Alsop, and is named after William Blizard, an English surgeon and founder of the London Hospital Medical College in 1785.

The year 2006 saw the refurbishment of The Octagon, the original library of the People's Palace dating back to 1888.

In 2007 parts of the School of Law – postgraduate facilities and the Centre for Commercial Law Studies – moved to premises in Lincoln's Inn Fields in central London. The Women at Queen Mary Exhibition was staged in the Octagon, marking 125 years of Westfield College and 120 years of Queen Mary College.

In September 2009, the world's first science education centre located within a working research laboratory opened at the Blizard Institute of Cell and Molecular Science, hoping to inspire children with school tours and interactive games and puzzles.

== 2010 to present ==
Queen Mary became one of the few university-level institutions to implement a requirement of the A* grade at A-Level after its introduction in 2010 on some of their most popular courses, such as Engineering, Law, and Medicine.

Following on from the 2010 UK student protests, Queen Mary set fees of £9,000 per year for September 2012 entry, while also offering bursaries and scholarships.

On 12 March 2012 it was announced that Queen Mary would be joining the Russell Group in August 2012. Later in March, Queen Mary and the University of Warwick announced the creation of a strategic partnership, including research collaboration, joint teaching of English, history and computer science undergraduates, and the creation of eight joint post-doctoral research fellowships.

In January 2013, Queen Mary established the world's first professorial chair in animal replacement science.

From 2014, Queen Mary began awarding its own degrees, rather than those of the University of London.
