= Programmes and stakeholders relations =

The Programmes and stakeholders relations Directorate or PSR, located in Brussels, Belgium and Ispra, Italy, is part of the Joint Research Centre (European Commission), a Directorate-General of the European Commission (EC).

The Programmes and stakeholders relations Directorate supports the JRC in the development and implementation of its relationships that will ensure the long-term success in the fulfilment of JRC mission and maximise its contribution to the objectives of the European Research Area (ERA).

== PSR Units ==
- Work Programme
- Intellectual property and scientific co-operation
- Customer and stakeholder relations
- Internal and external communications (Brussels/Ispra)
- Management support
- Work programme EURATOM
- Corporate Development

== Joint Research Centre Institutes ==
- Institute for Transuranium Elements (ITU)
- Institute for the Protection and the Security of the Citizen (IPSC)
- Institute for Environment and Sustainability (IES)
- Institute for Health and Consumer Protection (IHCP)
- Institute for Energy (IE)
- Institute for Prospective Technological Studies (IPTS)

== See also ==
- Directorate-General for Research (European Commission)
