= Institute for Energy and Transport =

Research institute in Petten, the Netherlands

The Institute for Energy and Transport (IET) is one of the seven scientific Institutes of the Joint Research Centre (JRC), a Directorate General of the European Commission (EC). It is based both in Petten, the Netherlands and Ispra, Italy, and has a multidisciplinary team of around 300 academic, technical, and support staff.

The mission of the IET is to provide support to European Union policies and technology innovation to ensure sustainable, safe, secure and efficient energy production, distribution and use and to foster sustainable and efficient transport in Europe.

IET is doing so by carrying out research in both nuclear and non-nuclear energy domains, with partners from the Member States and beyond. In state-of-the-art experimental facilities, IET carries out key scientific activities in the following fields: renewable energies including solar, photovoltaics and biomass; sustainable & safe nuclear energy for current & future reactor systems; energy infrastructures and security of supply; sustainable transport, fuels and technologies including hydrogen and fuel cells as well as clean fossil fuel; energy techno/economic assessment; bioenergy including biofuels; energy efficiency in buildings, industry, transport and end-use.

== Other JRC sites ==
- Institute for Reference Materials and Measurements (IRMM)
- Institute for Transuranium Elements (ITU)
- Institute for the Protection and the Security of the Citizen (IPSC)
- Institute for Environment and Sustainability (IES)
- Institute for Health and Consumer Protection (IHCP)
- Institute for Prospective Technological Studies (IPTS)

== See also ==
- Directorate-General for Research (European Commission)
- Energy Research Centre of the Netherlands
- Joint Research Centre (European Commission)
- Nuclear Research and Consultancy Group
- Energy law
