= International Laboratory Accreditation Cooperation =

International standardizing organization for laboratory testing and calibration

The International Laboratory Accreditation Cooperation or ILAC started as a conference in 1977 to develop international cooperation for facilitating trade by promoting the acceptance of accredited test and calibration results. In 1996, ILAC became a formal cooperation with a charter to establish a network of mutual recognition agreements among accreditation bodies that would fulfil this aim.

The ultimate aim of the ILAC is increased use and acceptance by industry as well as government of the results from accredited laboratories, including results from laboratories in other countries. In this way, the free-trade goal of a 'product tested once and accepted everywhere' can be realised.

== See also ==
- Accreditation
- Good laboratory practice (GLP)
- Institute for Reference Materials and Measurements (IRMM)
- International Federation of Clinical Chemistry and Laboratory Medicine
- ISO/IEC 17025
- Joint Committee for Traceability in Laboratory Medicine
- Reference range
- Reference values
