= Belgirate =

- Comune
- Comune di Belgirate

- Coat of arms

- Location within Italy Location within Piedmont
- Coordinates: 45°50′N 8°34′E
- Country: Italy
- Region: Piedmont
- Province: Verbano-Cusio-Ossola (VB)
- Frazioni: Carcioni

Government
  - Mayor: Giorgio Pollini

Area
  - Total: 8.4 km^{2} (3.2 sq mi)
- Elevation: 199 m (653 ft)

Population (30 September 2008)
  - Total: 542
  - Density: 65/km^{2} (170/sq mi)
- Demonym: Belgiratesi
- Time zone: UTC+1 (CET)
  - Summer (DST): UTC+2 (CEST)
- Postal code: 28832
- Dialing code: 0322
- Patron saint: Purification of the Holy Virgin

Belgirate is a comune (municipality) in the Province of Verbano-Cusio-Ossola in the Italian region of Piedmont, located about 110 kilometres (68 mi) northeast of Turin and about 11 kilometres (7 mi) south of Verbania.

Belgirate borders the following municipalities: Besozzo, Brebbia, Ispra, Leggiuno, Lesa, Monvalle, Stresa.

The small Romanesque church of St. Mary dates to the 11th century and is preceded by a 16th-century portico with some frescoes of Bernardino Luini school.
