= Institute for Reference Materials and Measurements =

Promotes a common European measurement system

The Institute for Reference Materials and Measurements (IRMM), located in Geel, Belgium, is one of the seven institutes of the Joint Research Centre (JRC), a Directorate-General of the European Commission (EC).

The IRMM promotes a common and reliable European measurement system in support of European Union policies. The institute works on the production and dissemination of quality assurance tools, such as validated methods, reference materials, reference measurements, interlaboratory comparisons and training in best practices and experience in all areas where IRMM is working.

The institute was founded in 1957 under the Treaties of Rome and started operation in 1960 under the name of the Central Bureau for Nuclear Measurements (CBNM). In 1986 the programme for a Community Bureau of Reference was announced. In 1993 the institute was renamed to reflect the new mission of the institute, which covers a wide range of measurement problems from food safety to environmental pollution.

The IRMM has six core areas of competence:

- Reference materials
- Food analysis
- Bioanalysis
- Chemical reference measurements
- Radionuclide metrology
- Neutron physics

== Other JRC sites ==
- Institute for Transuranium Elements (ITU)
- Institute for the Protection and the Security of the Citizen (IPSC)
- Institute for Environment and Sustainability (IES)
- Institute for Health and Consumer Protection (IHCP)
- Institute for Energy (IE)
- Institute for Prospective Technological Studies (IPTS)

== See also ==
- Directorate-General for Research (European Commission)
- European Committee for Standardization
- European School, Mol
- Good laboratory practice (GLP)
- International Bureau of Weights and Measures
- Joint Committee for Traceability in Laboratory Medicine
- Joint Research Centre (European Commission)
- National Institute of Standards and Technology (USA)
- Reference values
