= International Federation of Clinical Chemistry and Laboratory Medicine =

The International Federation of Clinical Chemistry and Laboratory Medicine (IFCC) is a global professional association that promotes the fields of clinical chemistry and laboratory medicine. It was established in Paris in 1952 as the International Association of Clinical Biochemists to organize the various national societies of these fields and is based in Milan, Italy.

The IFCC's aims are to set global standards, support and educate its members, and provide conferences and other gatherings for sharing knowledge among the global laboratory medicine community.

IFCC members fall into three groups: national societies of clinical chemistry and laboratory medicine, corporations, and affiliate international or national societies involved in laboratory medicine. As of 2023, these members represented more than 45,000 individual clinical chemists, laboratory scientists, and laboratory physicians.

== Structure and organization ==
The IFCC is governed by a council consisting of representatives appointed by member groups. The council elects an executive board, which carries out objectives via committees and the organization's divisions.

=== Divisions ===
The Scientific Division works to advance the science of clinical chemistry and to apply it to the practice of clinical laboratory medicine. It is responsible for responding to the scientific and technical needs of IFCC member societies, IFCC corporate members and external agencies. It instigates and promotes theoretical and practical developments in the field of standards and standardization in clinical chemistry.

The Education and Management Division provides IFCC members and the health-care community with education relevant to clinical chemistry and laboratory medicine. It administers a visiting lecturer program as well as clinical courses and workshops in molecular biology and other specialized areas.

The Communications and Publications Division promotes the work of the IFCC to scientists, physicians, and global health policy makers. It also publishes the academic journal eJIFCC.

The Emerging Technologies Division identifies new technologies that could be applied to laboratory medicine and explores applications for those technologies.

=== Committees ===
The Congresses and Conferences Committee administers and manages IFCC meetings and conferences.

== Partnerships ==
The IFCC partners with International Laboratory Accreditation Cooperation to educate the public and industry professionals on accreditation standards.

== See also ==
- National Glycohemoglobin Standardization Program (NGSP)
- Good Laboratory Practice (GLP)
- Institute for Reference Materials and Measurements (IRMM)
- International Laboratory Accreditation Cooperation
- ISO 15189
- Joint Committee for Traceability in Laboratory Medicine
- National Institute of Standards and Technology (NIST)
- Reference values
