= Croatian Society of Medical Biochemistry and Laboratory Medicine =

Croatian Society of Medical Biochemistry and Laboratory Medicine	
Founded	1953.
Location	Boskoviceva 18, Zagreb, Croatia
Members	750
Focus	non-profit professional association of medical biochemists in Croatia
President	Ana-Maria Šimundić
Website	www.hdmblm.hr/en

The Croatian Society of Medical Biochemistry and Laboratory Medicine (CSMBLM) is national autonomous, voluntary and non-profit professional association of medical biochemists established with the aim of professional and scientific development and improvement of medical biochemistry profession in Republic of Croatia.

Main activities of the CSMBLM are the promotion and development of medical biochemistry profession, external assessment of the performance quality of all medical biochemistry laboratories in the Republic of Croatia, publication of a scientific journal Biochemia Medica.

== History ==
The Croatian Society of Medical Biochemists (CSMB) was founded in 1953. Until 1988, CSMB had been part of the Croatian Pharmaceutical Society and afterwards became an autonomous association. In 2012, it changed its name to the Croatian Society of Medical Biochemistry and Laboratory Medicine (CSMBLM), in line with the current trends within the profession and with the recommendations of European and global professional associations. In 2015 it had 750 members.

== Objectives ==
Through the voluntary work of its members, CSMBLM is dedicated to improve the profession and scientific field of medical biochemistry and laboratory medicine, raise the level of public awareness at national level, encourage and provide assistance to its members in achieving professional and scientific excellence especially in performance quality of every segment of work in medical biochemistry laboratories.

== Activities ==
=== Biochemia Medica ===
CSMBLM publishes the scientific journal Biochemia Medica in the English language three times a year. It is included in databases such as Current Contents (Clinical Medicine), Medline, PubMed Central (PMC), Science Citation Index Expanded™ (SCIE, Thomson Reuters), Journal Citation Reports/Science Edition (JCR, Thomson Reuters), EMBASE/Excerpta Medica, Scopus, CAS (Chemical Abstracts Service), EBSCO/Academic Search Complete and DOAJ (Directory of Open Access Journals).

=== CROQALM – national external quality assessment programme in laboratory medicine ===
A significant task, regularly carried out by CSMBLM since 1970, is the external assessment of the performance quality of all medical biochemistry laboratories in the Republic of Croatia. The external evaluation programs are updated and continually expanded according to the needs of the profession and in line with the European organizations for labor quality assessment (EQAL). Assessment results are the basis for the rating of medical laboratories carried out by the Croatian Chamber of Medical Biochemists. In this way CSMBLM provides continuous professional and advisory help in harmonization and evaluation of laboratory results at national and international level for medical biochemistry laboratories and all other laboratories which work in a field of laboratory medicine.

=== Membership in professional organizations ===
CSMBLM cooperates with professional and scientific organizations of medical biochemistry in other countries. it has been a full member of the International Federation of Clinical Chemistry (IFCC) since 1972, first as part of the Yugoslav Society of Medical Biochemists and since 1992 as an independent party. In 1993, CSMBLM became a member of the Forum of the European Societies of Clinical Chemistry, nowadays the European Federation of Clinical Chemistry and Laboratory Medicine (EFLM).
