= Target range =

Target range may refer to:

- Shooting range
- Optimal health range, in medicine diagnostics, concentration ranges for optimal health as alternative to reference range based on normal distribution.
