= Lesa, Piedmont =

Lesa
- Comune
- Comune di Lesa
- A view of the frazione of Solcio.

- Location within Italy Location within Piedmont
- Coordinates: 45°50′N 8°34′E
- Country: Italy
- Region: Piedmont
- Province: Novara (NO)
- Frazioni: Villa Lesa, Solcio, Comnago, Calogna

Government
  - Mayor: Aloma Rezzaro

Area
  - Total: 12.5 km^{2} (4.8 sq mi)
- Elevation: 198 m (650 ft)

Population (Dec. 2004)
  - Total: 2,470
  - Density: 198/km^{2} (512/sq mi)
- Demonym: Lesiani
- Time zone: UTC+1 (CET)
  - Summer (DST): UTC+2 (CEST)
- Postal code: 28040
- Dialing code: 0322
- Website: Official website

Lesa is a comune (municipality) in the Province of Novara in the Italian region of Piedmont, located about 110 kilometres (68 mi) northeast of Turin and about 45 kilometres (28 mi) north of Novara.

Lesa borders the following municipalities: Belgirate, Brovello-Carpugnino, Ispra, Massino Visconti, Meina, Nebbiuno, Ranco, and Stresa.
