= Ranco =

Ranco may refer to:

Chile - from Mapudungun "Ran - Co" - tormentous water

- Lake Ranco
- Lago Ranco, Chile a city and municipality in Chile
- El Ranco Province

Italy

- Ranco, Lombardy
