= Institute for Prospective Technological Studies =

Spanish research institute

The Institute for Prospective Technological Studies (IPTS), located in Seville, Spain, is one of the seven institutes of the Joint Research Centre (JRC), a Directorate-General of the European Commission (EC).

== Projects ==
Its first project was ESTO, the European Science and Technology Observatory, which after some 10 years of work, developed into two new networks:

- ERAWATCH Network, a web-based service that presents information on national research policies, actors, organisations, programmes; and
- ETEPS Network (European Techno Economic Policy Support Network), a network of European organisations that operates in all 27 EU Member States, covering policy subjects such as agriculture, consumer protection, energy, environment, enterprise, health, information society, innovation, research, and transport.

The institute also co-develops the POLES energy model, with the French research institute LEPII and the consulting firm Enerdata.

== Other JRC sites ==
- Institute for Reference Materials and Measurements (IRMM)
- Institute for Transuranium Elements (ITU)
- Institute for the Protection and the Security of the Citizen (IPSC)
- Institute for Environment and Sustainability (IES)
- Institute for Health and Consumer Protection (IHCP)
- Institute for Energy (IE)

== See also ==
- Directorate-General for Research (European Commission)
