= ISR =

ISR may refer to:

== Organizations ==
- Institute for Strategy and Reconciliation
- Institutional and Scientific Relations, of the European Commission
- International Star Registry, a company selling the right to name stars
- ISR International School on the Rhine, Germany

== Publications ==
- ISR, a socialist magazine, 1900-1918
- Information Systems Research
- International Socialist Review (disambiguation), U.S. publications
- International Statistical Review
- International Studies Review
- Israel Studies Review

== Science and technology ==
=== Biology ===
- In-stent restenosis, recurrence of stenosis after stenting
- Plant-induced systemic resistance, plant response to infection

=== Computers ===
- In-Service Register or Interrupt Service Register, in a PIC
- Interrupt service routine

=== Other science ===
- In-situ recovery, a mining technique
- Incoherent scatter radar, for studying the ionosphere
- Intersecting Storage Rings, a particle collider at CERN
- Injection site reaction, a reaction that occurs initially at the site of an injection or infusion

== Other uses ==
- ISR, country code for Israel
- Indiana Southwestern Railway, US
- Inuvialuit Settlement Region, Northwest Territories, Canada
- Ipoh-KL Sentral Route, a train service, Malaysia
- ISR Racing, a team from Czech Republic
- Israir (designator ISR), an Israeli airline
- Italian Social Republic, 1943–1945
- Joint Functional Component Command for Intelligence, Surveillance and Reconnaissance, of the US Strategic Command
- Intelligence, surveillance and reconnaissance, in military intelligence
- International Search Report, in international patent law
