= Canadian Society of Clinical Chemists =

Non-profit scientific and professional society

- Logo
- Abbreviation: CSCC
- Formation: 1956
- Type: Professional Association for clinical chemists
- Purpose: Providing leadership in the practice of clinical biochemistry and clinical laboratory medicine; establishing standards for diagnostic services.
- Headquarters: Kingston, Ontario, Canada
- Region served: Canada
- Official language: English; French
- President: Ted Dunn
- Website: Official website

The Canadian Society of Clinical Chemists (CSCC) is a nonprofit scientific society that represents clinical chemists (also known as clinical biochemists) in Canada. The organization aims to advance the practice of clinical chemistry in Canada through the promotion of importance in education, research, and practice, working at the international, national, provincial, and local levels.

The CSCC is a full member of the International Federation of Clinical Chemistry and Laboratory Medicine (IFCC), which is associated with the International Union of Pure and Applied Chemistry (IUPAC).

== Background ==
In Canada, clinical chemists work as members of the medical laboratory management team, which consists of pathologists, laboratory managers, and senior technologists. They are primarily responsible for setting the standards of performance for the clinical biochemistry laboratory. The knowledge they acquired from post doctoral training programs is applied to maintain efficiency in the lab.

== History ==
The founding meeting for the CSCC was held in Montreal, Quebec on October 17, 1956. Since that time, the membership has grown to several hundred clinical chemists. In 1986 the Canadian Academy of Clinical Biochemistry was established as the academic body of the CSCC to oversee training, certification, accreditation, and professional development of clinical chemists in Canada. A syllabus for post doctoral training in clinical biochemistry was developed and is maintained by the CACB as a guide to program directors and trainees. The CSCC holds an Annual Scientific Congress and Annual General Meeting. The 61st annual CSCC conference was held in San Diego, CA, USA from July 31-August 4, 2017 as a joint meeting with the AACC.

== Activities ==
The CSCC monitors the quality of testing services and acts as technical experts to evaluate and select methods and instrumentation. They apply their clinical and technical knowledge to assist physicians in selecting and interpreting tests, as well as supporting the laboratory's research and teaching activities. The society also produces publications, including the scientific journal Clinical Biochemistry, a member newsletter CSCC News, and position papers on current issues such as cardiac troponin testing. Special interest groups have been developed to advance knowledge and produce solutions in Clinical Toxicology, Point-Of-Care Testing, Pediatric and Perinatal Biochemistry, Monoclonal Gammopathy, Autoverification of test results, and the Canadian Laboratory Initiative on Paediatric Reference Intervals - CALIPER.
