= Joint Committee for Traceability in Laboratory Medicine =

The Joint Committee for Traceability in Laboratory Medicine or JCTLM is collaboration between the International Bureau of Weights and Measures (BIPM), the International Federation for Clinical Chemistry and Laboratory Medicine (IFCC), and the International Laboratory Accreditation Cooperation (ILAC).

The goal of the JCTLM is to provide a worldwide platform to promote and give guidance on internationally recognized and accepted equivalence of measurements in laboratory medicine and traceability to appropriate measurement standards.

== See also ==
- Good laboratory practice (GLP)
- Institute for Reference Materials and Measurements (IRMM)
- Reference range
- Reference values
