= Energy Research Centre of the Netherlands =

Research institute in North Holland, the Netherlands

Coordinates: 52.786°N 4.678°E

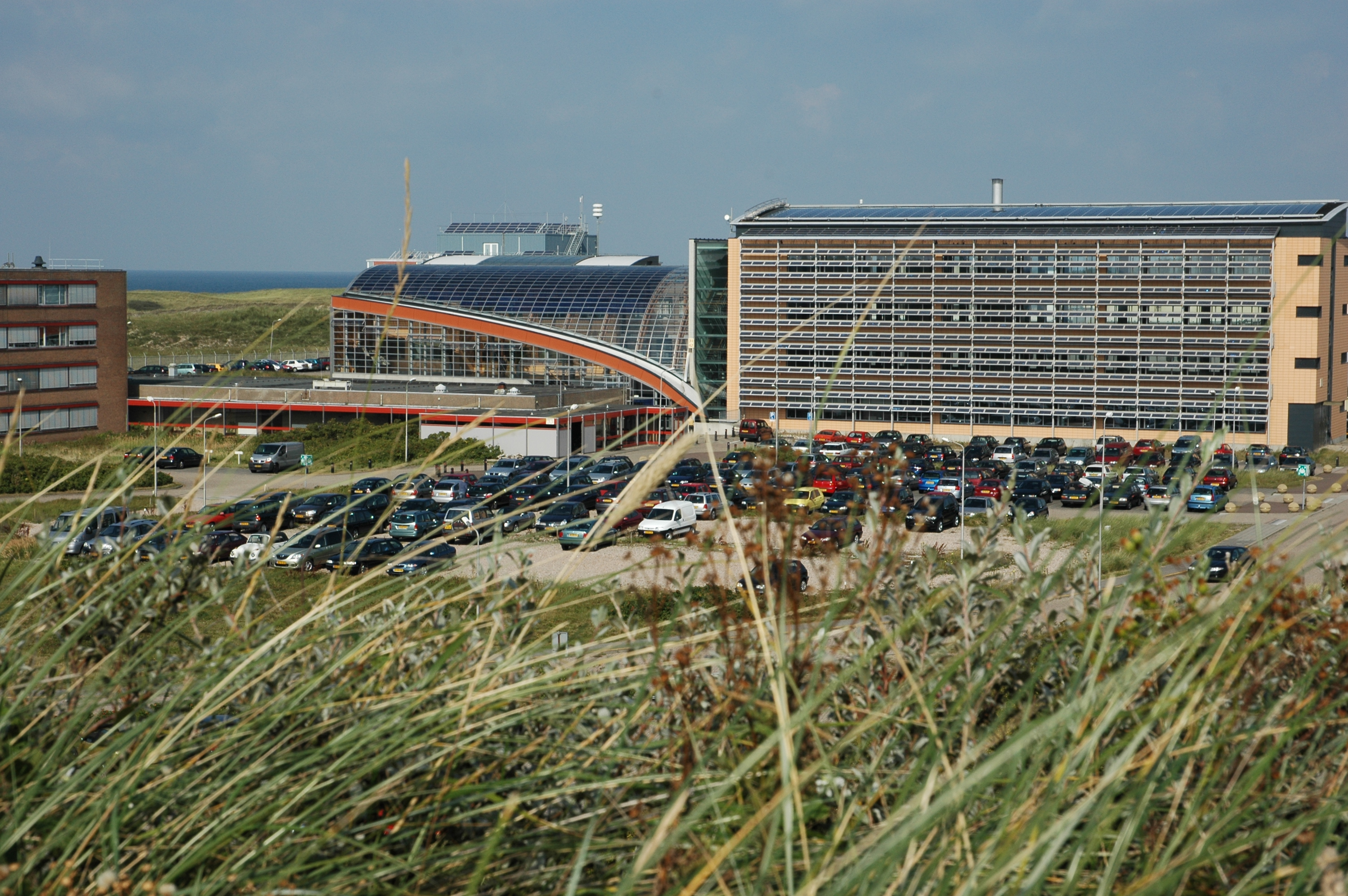
ECN in Petten

The Energy Research Centre of the Netherlands (ECN) is one of the largest energy research institute in Europe and holds a strong international position. With and for the market, ECN develops knowledge and technology that enable a transition to a sustainable energy system. The main office is located in Petten. ECN also has offices in Amsterdam, Eindhoven, Wieringermeer, Brussels and China. ECN has a staff of about 550 employees.

As of April 1, 2018, the Energy Research Centre of the Netherlands (ECN) has joined forces with the Netherlands Organisation for Applied Scientific Research (TNO) and is now 'ECN part of TNO', Our aim is to accelerate the energy transition in The Netherlands and beyond. From January 2020, the name 'ECN part of TNO' will be replaced by 'TNO Energy Transition', announced officially on October 10, 2019.

== Activities ==
ECN's research and technology development focuses on:

- Solar Energy
- Wind Energy
- Biomass
- Environmental research
- Energy efficiency
- Policy Studies

The total package of sustainable energy generation, clean use of fossil fuels and reduction of total energy use are key topics. ECN also conducts research on future opportunities and economic backgrounds in the field of energy.

== Publications ==
ECN researchers disseminate their results in publications such as reports, peer reviewed articles in scientific and professional journals, conference contributions and books and chapters in books. In 2011, ECN published 481 reports (public and confidential) and 176 articles in scientific journals.

== International position ==
ECN participates in international projects, advises authorities and collaborates with the industry in the Netherlands, Europe and worldwide. A number of examples:

- EERA: together with nine other research organisations in Europe, ECN founded the European Energy Research Alliance (EERA). The aim is to harmonise the research programmes through joint research and optimal deployment of facilities.
- ADEM: an initiative of ECN and three collaborating Technical Universities (Delft University of Technology, Eindhoven University of Technology, and the University of Twente). They wish to give strong impetus to Dutch materials research in relation to energy technology.
- FLOW: the FLOW programme enables Dutch businesses to take a leading position on the international market for offshore wind farms. The programme was initiated by RWE, Eneco, TenneT, Ballast Nedam, Van Oord, IHC Merwede, 2-B Energy, XECM Darwind, ECN and Delft University of technology.
- Solliance: Solliance is a collaboration of TNO, Eindhoven University of Technology, ECN and IMEC, focusing on research and development in the field of thin film solar panels (PV) in the ELAT region (Eindhoven-Louvain-Aachen triangle).
- CARENA (CAtalytic REactors based on New mAterials): a European collaborative project coordinated by ECN. The project aim to create possibilities for the use of cheaper, less reactive, raw materials by using membrane reactor technology. CARENA brings together companies and institutes from 8 European countries. European chemical companies as Akzo Nobel and Arkema ensure a strong industrial leadership to the project.

In addition, ECN participates in the Intergovernmental Panel on Climate Change and the International Energy Agency.

== History ==
ECN received its current name in 1976. Before that time, the centre, which was founded in 1955, was solely focused on the peaceful deployment of nuclear energy under the name of Reactor Centre Netherlands (RCN). In 1976 it became clear that the energy supply of the future should not rely on nuclear energy alone. Alternative forms of energy were called for. RCN was appointed as the institute that should conduct the largest part of this research.

== Subsidiary company ==
The Nuclear Research and Consultancy Group (NRG) is a full subsidiary of ECN and the most important manufacturer of radio-active isotopes for medical use in Europe. NRG manages the nuclear reactors in Petten, which are owned by the European Union. Admatec Europe is partially owned by ECN. Admatec Europe manufactures ceramic components via 3D printing.

== Board of directors and Supervisory Board ==
The Board of directors of ECN consists of one statutory director (chairman of the board of directors) and two deputy directors. The Supervisory Board consists of six members. It is the duty of the Supervisory Board to supervise the administration of the foundation by the Board of directors as well as the general affairs. The members of the Supervisory Board are appointed by the Dutch Minister of Economic Affairs, Agriculture and Innovation.

== Controversies ==
A former director of ECN, Wim Stam, made headlines with his private investment in four windmills. In his role as public servant, Wim Stam also advised the Dutch Government on the placement, quality and efficiency of wind mills. Wim made over one million Euros with his private investments. As a result of his actions, ECN changed its regulations so conflict of interests would be prevented in the future.

== See also ==
- Institute for Energy (IE)
