= Marginal abatement cost =

Marginal cost of reducing pollution

Abatement cost is the cost of reducing environmental negatives such as pollution. Marginal cost is an economic concept that measures the cost of an additional unit. The marginal abatement cost, in general, measures the cost of reducing one more unit of pollution. Marginal abatement costs are also called the "marginal cost" of reducing such environmental negatives.

Although marginal abatement costs can be negative, such as when the low carbon option is cheaper than the business-as-usual option, marginal abatement costs often rise steeply as more pollution is reduced. In other words, it becomes more expensive [technology or infrastructure changes] to reduce pollution past a certain point.

Marginal abatement costs are typically used on a marginal abatement cost curve, which shows the marginal cost of additional reductions in pollution.

== Usage ==
Carbon traders use marginal abatement cost curves to derive the supply function for modelling carbon price fundamentals. Power companies may employ marginal abatement cost curves to guide their decisions about long-term capital investment strategies to select among a variety of efficiency and generation options. Economists have used marginal abatement cost curves to explain the economics of interregional carbon trading. Policy-makers use marginal abatement cost curves as merit order curves, to analyze how much abatement can be done in an economy at what cost, and where policy should be directed to achieve the emission reductions.

However, marginal abatement cost curves should not be used as abatement supply curves (or merit order curves) to decide which measures to implement in order to achieve a given emission-reduction target. Indeed, the options they list would take decades to implement, and it may be optimal to implement expensive but high-potential measures before introducing cheaper measures.

== Criticism ==
The way that marginal abatement cost curves are usually built has been criticized for lack of transparency and the poor treatment it makes of uncertainty, inter-temporal dynamics, interactions between sectors and ancillary benefits. There is also concern regarding the biased ranking that occurs if some included options have negative costs.

== Examples of existing marginal abatement cost curves ==
Worldwide, marginal abatement cost studies show that improving the energy efficiency of buildings and replacing fossil fuelled power plants with renewables are usually the most cost effective ways of reducing carbon emissions.

Various economists, research organizations, and consultancies have produced marginal abatement cost curves. Bloomberg New Energy Finance and McKinsey & Company have produced economy wide analyses on greenhouse gas emissions reductions for the United States. ICF International produced a California specific curve following the Global Warming Solutions Act of 2006 legislation as have Sweeney and Weyant.

The Wuppertal Institute for Climate, Environment and Energy produced several marginal abatement cost curves for Germany (also called Cost Potential Curves), depending on the perspective (end-user, utilities, society).

The US Environmental Protection Agency has done work on a marginal abatement cost curve for non-carbon dioxide emissions such as methane, N_{2}O, and hydrofluorocarbons. Enerdata and Laboratoire d'Economie de la Production et de l'Intégration-Le Centre national de la recherche scientifique (France) produce marginal abatement cost curves with the Prospective Outlook on Long-term Energy Systems (POLES) model for the 6 Kyoto Protocol gases. These curves have been used for various public and private actors either to assess carbon policies or through the use of a carbon market analysis tool.

The World Bank 2013 low-carbon energy development plan for Nigeria, prepared jointly with the World Bank, utilizes marginal abatement cost curves created in Analytica.

== See also ==
- Environmental economics
- Marginal cost
- Social cost
