= Nuclear Research and Consultancy Group =

Dutch research and consultancy firm

Nuclear Research and Consultancy Group (NRG) is a Dutch institute that performs nuclear research for the government and private companies. It is the most important producer of radionuclides, such as molybdenum-99, lutetium-177 and iridium-192, in Europe and maintains and operates the Petten nuclear reactor.

The institute also offers services to medical, chemical, oil, and gas companies.

== See also ==
- Energy Research Centre of the Netherlands
- Institute for Energy (IE)
- EURATOM
