= European Science and Technology Observatory =

Spanish research project

The European Science and Technology Observatory (ESTO) was the first project of the Joint Research Centre's Institute for Prospective Technological Studies based in Seville, Spain.

It was set up to attempt to "create a platform of experts engaged in monitoring and analysing scientific and technological developments and their relation and interaction with society." After some 10 years of work, ESTO developed into two new networks: the ERAWATCH Network, a web-based service that presents information on national research policies, actors, organisations, programmes; and the ETEPS Network (European Techno Economic Policy Support Network), a network of European organisations that operates in all 27 EU Member States, covering policy subjects such as agriculture, consumer protection, energy, environment, enterprise, health, information society, innovation, research, and transport.

== See also ==
- Joint Research Centre (European Commission)
- Directorate-General for Research (European Commission)
