= Ranco, Lombardy =

Ranco
- Comune
- Comune di Ranco
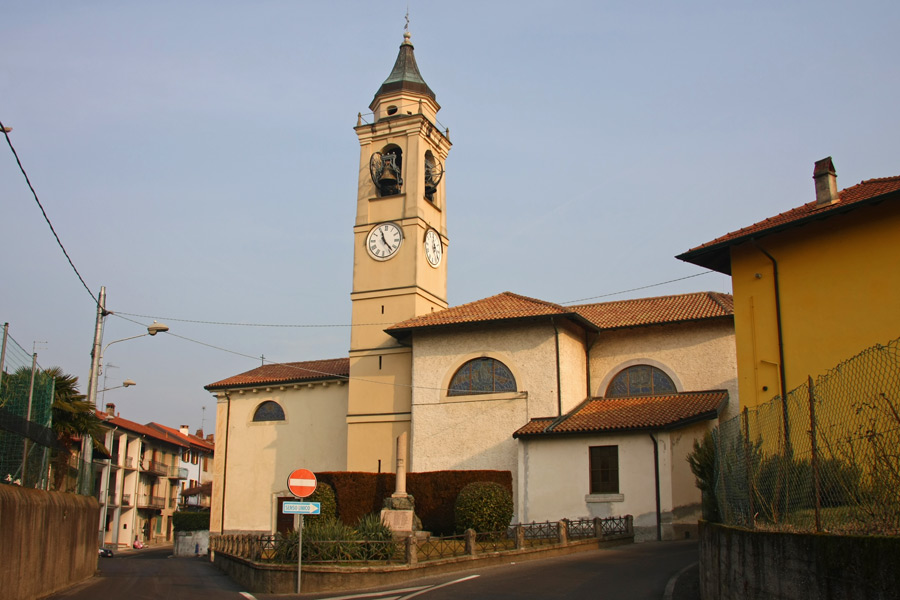
- Church

- Location within Italy Location within Lombardy
- Coordinates: 45°48′N 8°34′E
- Country: Italy
- Region: Lombardy
- Province: Province of Varese (VA)
- Frazioni: Uponne

Area
  - Total: 6.3 km^{2} (2.4 sq mi)

Population (December 2004)
  - Total: 1,188
  - Density: 190/km^{2} (490/sq mi)
- Demonym: Ranchesi
- Time zone: UTC+1 (CET)
  - Summer (DST): UTC+2 (CEST)
- Postal code: 21020
- Dialing code: 0331

Ranco is a comune (municipality) on the shore of Lago Maggiore in the Province of Varese in the Italian region Lombardy, located about 60 kilometres (37 mi) northwest of Milan and about 20 kilometres (12 mi) west of Varese. As of 31 December 2004, it had a population of 1,188 and an area of 6.3 square kilometres (2.4 mi^{2}).

The village has a Guide Michelin acclaimed restaurant (Il sole di Ranco) and a Transport Museum. The municipality of Ranco contains the frazione (subdivision) Uponne.

The village is home to an interesting church – the Baroque Church of SS Martino and Lorenzo. It contains a number of frescoes dating back to the early 1900s and which were painted by Antonio Candeo. There is also a statue dedicated to the Madonna del Rosario inside, along with a wooden pulpit dating back to 1928.

Also in Ranco is the Cascina Massari. Here you will find an old bakery oven. This would once have been used by local residents who lived here. Next to this is the Massari fountain. This is a fountain which uses an old Roman child's sarcophagus as a basin and which would once have been connected to the old aqueduct.

Ranco borders the following municipalities: Angera, Ispra, Lesa, Meina.

== Demographic evolution ==
Historical population

Year	Pop.	±%
1861	447	—
1871	498	+11.4%
1881	517	+3.8%
1901	624	+20.7%
1911	659	+5.6%

Year	Pop.	±%
1921	593	−10.0%
1931	584	−1.5%
1936	546	−6.5%
1951	653	+19.6%
1961	742	+13.6%

Year	Pop.	±%
1971	851	+14.7%
1981	1,014	+19.2%
1991	970	−4.3%
2001	1,108	+14.2%

Source: Data from ISTAT
