= Biochemia Medica =

- Discipline: Biochemistry
- Language: English
- Edited by: Daria Pašalić

Publication details
- Former name: Glasnik Hrvatskog Drustva Medicinskih Biokemicara
- History: 1991–present
- Publisher: Croatian Society of Medical Biochemistry and Laboratory Medicine (Croatia)
- Frequency: Triannual
- Open access: Yes
- License: Creative Commons Attribution 4.0
- Impact factor: 3.653 (2017)

Standard abbreviations
- ISO 4: Biochem. Med. (Zagreb)

Indexing
- ISSN: 1330-0962 (print); 1846-7482 (web)
- OCLC no.: 909880511

Links
- Journal homepage; Online archive

Biochemia Medica is a triannual peer-reviewed scientific journal covering biochemistry, clinical chemistry, and laboratory medicine. It was established in 1991 and is published by the Croatian Society of Medical Biochemistry and Laboratory Medicine. In 2006, the existing editor-in-chief and editorial board were replaced, and the new editorial board redesigned the journal's entire format; soon afterward, the journal was indexed in both EMBASE and Scopus. The journal received its first impact factor from the Journal Citation Reports in 2010, based on articles published in 2009. The editor-in-chief is Daria Pašalić (School of Medicine, University of Zagreb). According to the Journal Citation Reports, the journal has a 2017 impact factor of 3.653.
