= Petten nuclear reactor =

Research reactor in Petten, Netherlands

Coordinates: 52°47′16″N 4°40′39″E

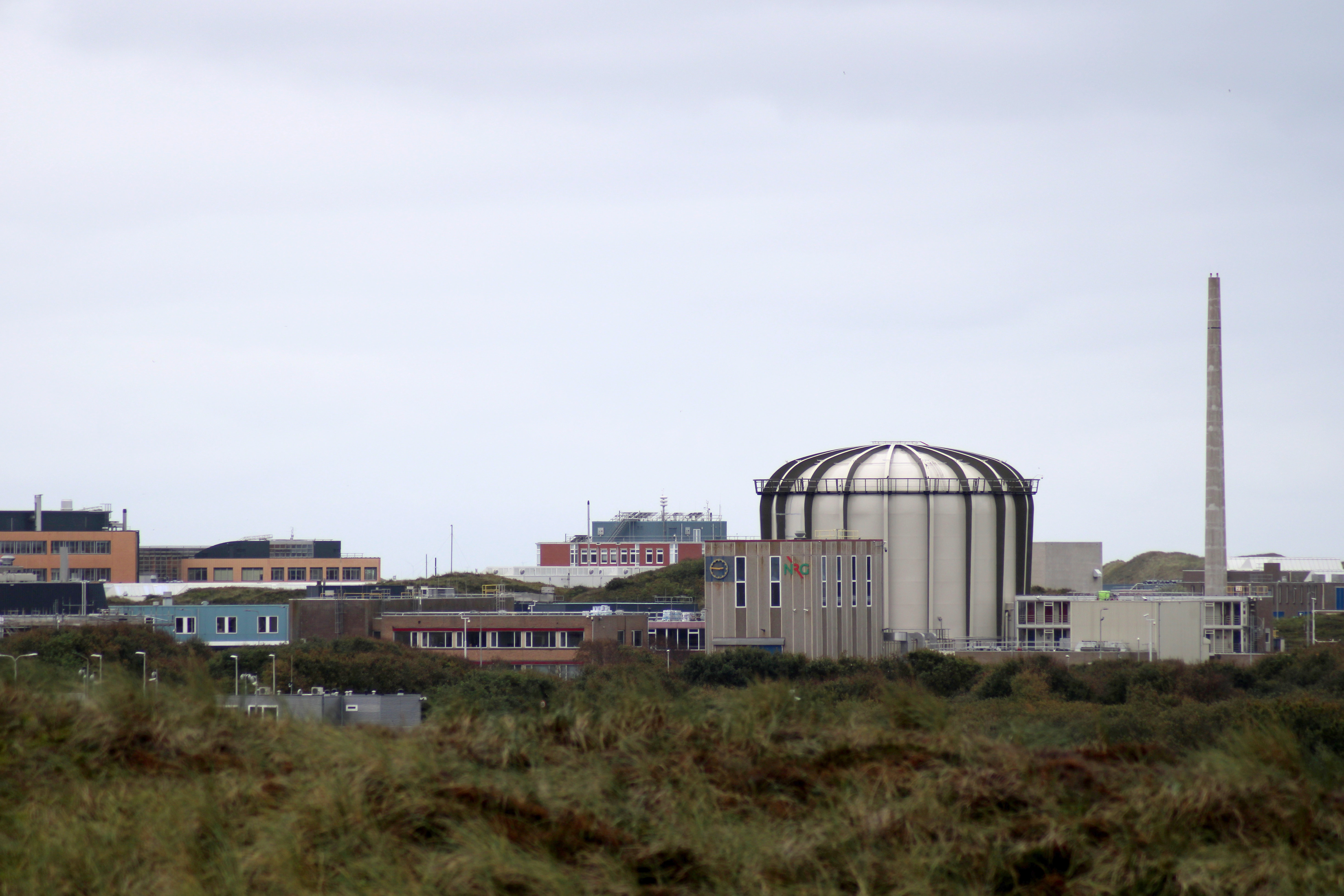
Petten High Flux Reactor

The Petten High Flux Reactor (HFR) is a nuclear research reactor located in Petten, Netherlands. The HFR is on the premises of the Petten research centre and it is a high flux reactor. It is owned by the Joint Research Centre (JRC) and managed by the Nuclear Research and Consultancy Group (NRG). The HFR’s original purpose was to provide experience and irradiation capabilities for the nascent Dutch nuclear power program. Construction began in 1958, and the reactor reached criticality on the 9th of November, 1961.

== History ==
The construction of the HFR was one of the first contracts to be fulfilled by the Nuclear Reactor Engineering Organisation (also known as Nuclear Products – ERCO), an unincorporated division of American Car & Foundry Industries Incorporated (ACF) that formed in 1954 in order to enable ACF to enter the commercial nuclear reactor sector. The contract was signed in May 1956. Under the Atoms for Peace program, an export license was granted to ACF and construction began at the site in Petten in 1958. However, in 1959 ACF sold its nuclear division to Allis-Chalmers, who took over the project and commissioned the reactor, reaching criticality two years behind schedule on November 9th, 1961.

== Medical importance ==
Apart from its function as a research centre, the HFR is a large producer of radioactive material for the purpose of medical diagnosis and the treatment of cancer (radiopharmaceuticals). As of 2010, the nuclear facility supplied about 60% of the European demand for medical isotopes. Also at the high flux reactor, one of the neutron beam channels, which was originally installed for performing fundamental research, has been specially modified for the direct irradiation of patients. This allows use of neutrons for the treatment of tumors after saturation of these tumors with a pharmaceutical containing boron. When hit by a weak neutron beam, boron will locally emit radiation that will destroy the tumor. This technique is mainly suitable for the treatment of brain tumors.

== Technology ==
As of 2006, only low-enriched uranium fuel was used at the facilities in Petten. As a result of political pressure from the United States and the International Atomic Energy Agency (IAEA), research reactors are no longer allowed to use highly enriched uranium fuel because of its potential use for the production of nuclear weapons. The use of highly enriched uranium targets for the production of medical isotopes was discontinued in January 2018.

=== The high flux reactor ===
Its capacity was increased in steps to 45 MW (thermal) by 1970. The reactor is property of the European Commission and is operated by the Nuclear Research and Consultancy Group (NRG).

As of 2024, the reactor is expected to remain operational until 2030, when it will be replaced at Petten by a new high flux reactor (PALLAS).

In August 2008, the reactor was shut down due to corrosion in its primary cooling circuit. The operator brought the plant back online in February 2009.

=== The low flux reactor ===
The low-flux reactor was first used in 1960 and permanently shut down in 2010. It had a capacity of 30 kW. The reactor was the property of the Nuclear Research and Consultancy Group (NRG) and mainly used for the production of neutrons for biological and physical research.

== Timeline ==
In 2009 the Argentine company INVAP (teamed with Spanish group Isolux) was pre selected in the international tender for the PALLAS project, for the procurement of an 80 MW nuclear reactor for the Dutch village of Petten, but in February 2010, the Dutch radiopharmaceutical producer Nuclear Research and Consultancy Group (NRG) extended the preparatory phase up to end of the year for financing

In mid-May 2014, NRG, the company that operates the reactor, requested a bridging loan from the Dutch Ministry of Economic Affairs due to financial losses in previous years. A bankruptcy could not be ruled out if the credit were refused. In addition, negotiations with the banks were underway due to the estimated 80 million euros needed for the upcoming maintenance of the 50-year-old reactor.

== See also ==
- BR2, a high-flux reactor at SCK CEN in Mol (Belgium), producing radioisotopes
- Chalk River Laboratories, a nuclear facility in Ontario that formerly produced North America's supply of isotopes for nuclear medicine
- Borssele Nuclear Power Station
- Dodewaard nuclear power plant
