= Clinical Biochemistry =

Peer-reviewed scientific journal

- Discipline: Biochemistry
- Language: English
- Edited by: Peter Kavsak

Publication details
- History: 1967–present
- Publisher: Elsevier
- Frequency: 18/year
- Impact factor: 2.584 (2017)

Standard abbreviations
- ISO 4: Clin. Biochem.

Indexing
- ISSN: 0009-9120

Links
- Journal homepage; Online access

Clinical Biochemistry is a peer-reviewed scientific journal covering the analytical and clinical investigation of laboratory tests in humans used for diagnosis, molecular biology and genetics, prognosis, treatment and therapy, and monitoring of disease; the discipline of clinical biochemistry. It is the official journal of the Canadian Society of Clinical Chemists.

== Abstracting and indexing ==
The journal is abstracted and indexed in BIOSIS, Chemical Abstracts, Current Contents/Life Sciences, EMBASE, MEDLINE, and Scopus.

== Article categories ==
The journal publishes the following types of articles:

- Research articles
- Short Communications
- Techniques articles
- Special Reports
- Letters to the Editor

== Most cited articles ==
According to SCOPUS, the following three articles have been cited most often (>70 times):

1. Herget-Rosenthal, S.; Bökenkamp, A.; Hofmann, W. (2007). "How to estimate GFR-serum creatinine, serum cystatin C or equations?". Clinical Biochemistry. 40 (3–4): 153–161. doi:10.1016/j.clinbiochem.2006.10.014. PMID 17234172.
2. Juliana F. Roos; Jenny Doust; Susan E. Tett; Carl M.J. Kirkpatrick (2007). "Diagnostic accuracy of cystatin C compared to serum creatinine for the estimation of renal dysfunction in adults and children-A meta-analysis". Clinical Biochemistry. 40 (5–6): 383–391. doi:10.1016/j.clinbiochem.2006.10.026. PMID 17316593.
3. Atta, H.M.; Mahfouz, S.; Fouad, H.H.; Roshdy, N.K.; Ahmed, H.H.; Rashed, L.A.; Sabry, D.; Hassouna, A.A.; Hasan, N.M (2007). "Therapeutic potential of bone marrow-derived mesenchymal stem cells on experimental liver fibrosis". Clinical Biochemistry. 40 (12): 893–899. doi:10.1016/j.clinbiochem.2007.04.017. PMID 17543295.

== Baby Wash Products found to contain cannabinoid immunoassay ==
Researchers at the University of North Carolina published an article in Clinical Biochemistry which found Baby wash products could cause false drug test results. Newborn drug screening has a significant implications in both the healthcare and legal domains, on occasion resulting in involvement by social services or false child abuse allegations. The accuracy of the screening results is therefore essential. This research highlights reasons why false positive cannabinoid (THC) screening results may have occurred. Researchers identified commonly used soap and wash products used for newborn and infant care as potential causes of false positive THC screening results.
