= Good laboratory practice =

(GLP) a lab quality standard

The Principles of Good Laboratory Practice (GLP) establish rules and criteria for a quality system that oversees the organizational processes and conditions in which non-clinical (non-pharmaceutical) health and environmental safety–or simply toxicology–studies are planned, conducted, monitored, recorded, reported, and archived. These principles apply to the toxicity testing of chemicals in commerce, to ensure the quality and integrity of the safety data submitted by manufacturers to regulatory authorities globally.

== History ==
The historical events leading to the proposal of the Good Laboratory Practice (GLP) regulations are crucial for understanding why these regulations are important to improve the quality and integrity of chemical safety data. They were developed in response to concerns about the reliability of toxicity data from industry. The GLP regulations aim to standardize procedures and practices to ensure accurate, reliable, and traceable safety data.

GLP was first introduced in New Zealand and Denmark in 1972, but only as quality standards for re-agents and lab materials (first created in Australia due to being isolated from western labs by the Japanese blockade of WW2); the US FDA heard about them from NZ at an international conference just as the below IBT scandal broke).

During the 1960s and 1970s, a growing concern for environmental issues and health impacts of chemicals was one factor in increased federal regulation, particularly in the chemical and pharmaceutical sectors, leading to more stringent product testing requirements and the development of inspection programs targeting laboratories conducting animal research in developed countries. These initiatives, initiated in the US by the Office of New Drugs and the Office of Marketed Drugs in 1969 and later expanded with the Office of Compliance, included inspections of facilities with questionable study validity or misconduct tips, revealing significant quality control issues and deficiencies in animal toxicological testing standards and data reporting.

Industrial BioTest Labs (IBT) was the most notable whistleblower case where thousands of safety tests for chemical manufacturers were either falsely claimed to have been performed or were of such poor quality that police investigators could not determine the extent of the work completed, despite superficially delivering test results as specified in their contracts with the manufacturers. IBT, a contract laboratory based in Northbrook, Illinois, conducted research for the United States government and various chemical and pharmaceutical companies, both from the U.S. and abroad, and submitted toxicology data to several federal agencies, covering a wide range of products including drugs, insecticides, herbicides, food additives, pesticides, cosmetics, and cleaning products.

These issues were aired in hearings at the US Congress, which pressured the FDA to propose draft Regulations on GLP on November 19, 1976, and establishment of the Final Rule in June 1979 which became effective on June 20, 1979. Proposed amendments were introduced on October 29, 1984. The GLP amendment Final Rule was published on September 4, 1987 and became effective on October 5, 1987.

Many of the fraudulent safety data concerned chemicals overseen by the new Environmental Protection Agency (EPA), so their GLP rule was developed simultaneously with FDA, the EPA issuing its draft GLP regulations in 1979 and 1980, publishing the Final Rules in two separate parts (40 CFR 160 and 40 CFR 792) in 1983.

GLP requires not only that the methods of safety tests be transparent, but that they be so detailed that a different laboratory using it will get the same result. Considering that Japan, Netherlands, US and others had at same time as GLP begun requiring demonstrations of safety before chemicals gained access markets; the Organisation for Economic Cooperation & Development decided that multinational companies needed globally uniform regulation of chemicals, such that a toxicity test performed in one country could be accepted by another. OECD was thus happy to add the new USA GLP requirement into their new, globally-required test methods, called ‘OECD Test Guidelines’ (see below OECD section).

== US Food and Drug Administration ==
(21 CFR Part 58)

The FDA requires nonclinical laboratory studies on new drugs, food additives, and chemicals to assess their safety and potential effectiveness in humans in compliance with 21 CFR Part 58, Good Laboratory Practice for Nonclinical Studies under the Federal Food Drug and Cosmetic Act and Public Health Service Act. These regulations set the standards for conducting experimental laboratory studies that support or are intended to support applications for research or marketing permits for products such as food additives, drugs, medical devices, or biological products. Conducting these studies with rigorous adherence to scientific principles and quality control is crucial, as the decisions based on their outcomes directly affect human health and safety. By adhering to the requirements outlined in 21 CFR Part 58, laboratories conducting laboratory studies can ensure that the data generated are of high quality, reliable, and suitable for submission to the Agency as part of product approval processes.

Compliance with GLP regulations helps to protect the safety and welfare of humans and animals involved in studies and contributes to the overall integrity of scientific research in the development of FDA-regulated products. GLP compliance inspections are assessed and performed under the Agency's Bioresearch Monitoring (BIMO) program and carried out by trained BIMO inspectors. Serious noncompliance is dealt with by procedures ranging from study rejection to laboratory disqualification.

Since June 20, 1979, the FDA has received many questions about Good Laboratory Practice (GLP) regulations (21 CFR 58). The responses to these inquiries are stored in the Dockets Management Branch (HFA-305) and shared with the Agency's Bioresearch Monitoring (BIMO) program managers and district offices to ensure consistency. Consequently, the US FDA published the 1981 Questions & Answers - Good Laboratory Practice Regulations document to consolidate and clarify these responses. This Q&A document categorizes responses by specific GLP provisions to make them more useful for both the FDA headquarters and field offices.

The FDA has signed a memorandum of understanding (MOU) with Canada, France, Germany, Italy, Japan, The Netherlands, Sweden, and Switzerland to enhance cooperation on good laboratory practice (GLP) for nonclinical laboratory studies supporting product approvals, aiming to facilitate information exchange and inspections for regulatory oversight.

Proposed amendments were published in the Federal Register on August 24, 2016, which aimed to require a comprehensive quality system approach known as a GLP Quality System to enhance the current quality system approach for nonclinical laboratory studies. This system would be mandatory for safety and toxicity studies that support or are intended to support applications or submissions for products regulated by the FDA. Proposed modifications to the GLP Quality System include additional responsibilities for testing facility management and SOP maintenance, along with expanded definitions applicable to all nonclinical laboratory studies, aiming to enhance roles and functions aligned with the revised testing facility definition and to establish a framework for improving data reliability in regulatory decision-making.

== U.S. Environmental Protection Agency ==
The EPA's Good Laboratory Practice Standards (GLPS) compliance monitoring program guarantees the accuracy and reliability of test data submitted to the Agency to support pesticide product registration under the Federal Insecticide, Fungicide and Rodenticide Act (FIFRA), section 5 of the Toxic Substances Control Act (TSCA), and in accordance with testing consent agreements and rules issued under section 4 of TSCA. The Agency utilizes data obtained from laboratory inspections and audits to oversee the use of pesticides and industrial chemicals.

40 CFR Part 160, Good Laboratory Practice Standards pertains specifically to the Good Laboratory Practice (GLP) standards for pesticide chemicals. It establishes the requirements for conducting studies and generating data used for the registration of pesticides under the Federal Insecticide, Fungicide, and Rodenticide Act (FIFRA). This regulation applies primarily to studies conducted to support the registration or re-registration of pesticide products under FIFRA. It includes studies related to human health and environmental effects of pesticides. It focuses specifically on studies related to pesticide products, including toxicity studies, residue chemistry studies, environmental fate studies, and other types of studies required for pesticide registration. It operates within the context of pesticide regulation under FIFRA, which is specific to the registration and use of pesticides in the United States.

40 CFR Part 792, Good Laboratory Practice Standards, covers the broader application of GLP standards for nonclinical laboratory studies conducted for assessing the safety or efficacy of chemical substances, including pesticides, under various regulatory programs overseen by the EPA. This regulation applies to nonclinical laboratory studies conducted for various purposes beyond pesticides, encompassing studies related to chemicals, drugs, food additives, and other substances regulated by the EPA. This part has a broader scope and is applicable to a wider range of substances and regulatory programs. It covers a more diverse range of nonclinical studies, including those related to chemical substances other than pesticides. This could include studies conducted for assessing the safety of industrial chemicals, pharmaceuticals, food additives, and other substances subject to EPA regulation. It operates across various regulatory programs within the EPA, reflecting a broader framework for ensuring the quality and reliability of nonclinical study data used in regulatory decision-making.

While both 40 CFR Part 160 and 40 CFR Part 792 address GLP standards for laboratory studies, they differ significantly in terms of scope, applicability, and the specific regulatory context in which they operate. Part 160 is tailored to pesticide registration under FIFRA, whereas Part 792 is a more comprehensive framework applicable to a wider range of laboratory studies conducted for regulatory purposes across different EPA programs.

== European Union ==
The Principles of GLP help ensure the quality and accuracy of data in chemical testing, and help prevent scientific fraud, as adopted by the European Union (EU). European GLP Regulations and Directives also apply to European Economic Area (EEA) member states which include Iceland, Liechtenstein, and Norway. GLP principles govern the laboratory safety testing of substances in various products, mandated by product-specific legislation in the EU/EEA.

Directive 2004/9/EC mandates EU/EEA countries to designate GLP inspection authorities and includes requirements for reporting and mutual acceptance of data within the internal market. Annex I of the Directive incorporates OECD Revised Guides for Compliance Monitoring Procedures for GLP, along with OECD Guidance for the Conduct of Test Facility Inspections and Study Audits. It ensures compliance with these guidelines during laboratory inspections and study audits. This directive replaced Directive 88/320/EEC as of 11 March 2004.

Directive 2004/10/EC, the second core EU GLP Directive, harmonizes laws and administrative provisions for applying GLP principles and verifying their implementation in chemical substance tests. It includes GLP principles in Annex I and requires EU/EEA countries to ensure that laboratories conducting safety studies on chemical products comply with OECD GLP principles. It replaces Directive 87/18/EEC.

The Clinical Trials Facilitation Group (CTFG) of the Heads of Medicines Agency issued a Q&A document in 2017 addressing Good Laboratory Practice (GLP) requirements within the context of clinical trials for human medicines. This document aims to provide clarification and guidance on GLP principles applicable to non-clinical safety studies conducted as part of clinical trial applications.

In March 2024, the Clinical Trials Coordination Group (CTCG) of the Heads of Medicines Agencies released a new recommendation paper on the principles of Good Laboratory Practices (GLP) for clinical trial applications governed by the EU Clinical Trials Regulation (Regulation (EU) No 536/2014). This paper was developed in collaboration with relevant groups from the European Medicines Agency (EMA) and the European Commission (EC) to clarify the applicable regulatory requirements and ensure transparency regarding the level of information required about GLP status in Clinical Trial Applications. This will assist researchers and sponsors in understanding what is expected and how to include the necessary information to support their applications.

GLP supports the sharing of test data between countries, which helps avoid repeated testing, benefits animal welfare, and saves money for businesses and governments. Having common GLP standards also makes it easier to share information and prevents trade barriers, while helping to protect human health and the environment. The EU has established Mutual Recognition Agreements for GLP with Israel, Japan, and Switzerland.

== Key role for the Organisation for Economic Cooperation and Development ==
USA's new GLP rule was adopted into the new toxicity test methods (called the Test Guidelines, TG) that the OECD created. The OECD Principles of Good Laboratory Practice (GLP) cover the testing of chemicals or chemical products in non-clinical settings, either in laboratory conditions or environmental settings, such as greenhouses and field experiments. These principles exclude studies involving human subjects. Depending on the location or governing rules in an OECD-member country, the OECD Principles of GLP might also extend to non-clinical safety testing of other regulated items, like medical devices.

Examples studies conducted under GLP in OECD-member countries include:

1. Physical-chemical testing;
2. Toxicity studies;
3. Mutagenicity studies;
4. Environmental toxicity studies on aquatic and terrestrial organisms;
5. Studies on behavior in water, soil, and air; bioaccumulation;
6. Studies to determine pesticide residues in food or animal feedstuffs;
7. Studies on effects on mesocosms and natural ecosystems;
8. Analytical and clinical chemistry testing.

Safety testing data must be submitted to regulatory authorities for product marketing authorization. During the review process, the submitted data undergoes verification to ensure compliance with GLP standards. Additionally, the GLP compliance status of the testing facility where the study was conducted is assessed by referring to inspection information from national GLP compliance monitoring programs.

OECD member countries where non-clinical health and environmental safety testing follows the OECD Principles of Good Laboratory Practice (GLP) have established national GLP Compliance Monitoring Programs (CMP) responsible for overseeing GLP compliance of test facilities within their jurisdictions. These CMPs verify GLP compliance through inspections of test facilities and audits of GLP studies. Test facilities that undergo periodic inspections by a CMP and are found to operate in accordance with GLP principles are recognized as GLP compliant.

In OECD-member countries, testing facilities seeking recognition as GLP compliant can apply to the national CMP. The CMP then conducts inspections to assess if the test facility adheres to the OECD Principles of GLP. In other countries, CMPs have the authority to inspect any test facility that claims to conduct studies according to GLP standards.

== OECD's Mutual Acceptance of Data (MAD) ==
The chemicals industry, which includes industrial chemicals, pharmaceuticals, pesticides, biocides, food and feed additives, and cosmetics, ranks as one of the largest industrial sectors in the world. Harmonizing national approaches (the OECD's key mission) to chemical regulation offers several benefits: it streamlines requirements for industry, provides governments with a common framework for collaboration, and reduces trade barriers. Simultaneously, the OECD adopted 1) the Mutual Acceptance of Data (MAD) Directive system; and 2) the OECD Guidelines for Testing Chemicals and OECD Principles of Good Laboratory Practice (GLP), to be required by regulators globally (and to which the MAD Directive applies). These two simultaneous acts were instrumental in achieving this global harmonization.

The MAD system aims to avoid conflicting or redundant national regulations, foster cooperation among national authorities, and eliminate trade barriers. Under this system, OECD countries and full adherents agree that safety tests conducted according to OECD Test Guidelines and Good Laboratory Practice in one country should be accepted by others for assessment purposes—a principle known as "tested once, accepted for assessment everywhere." This approach saves the chemicals industry from the expense of duplicative testing for products marketed in multiple countries. Crucially, though a receiving government must accept a TG-performed study, it retains the discretion to rely on other data (e.g. on the toxicity findings of publicly-funded academics, whose methods are very heterogeneous, but who test, and often find, toxicity at much lower doses that industry's TG studies); or, a nation may interpret the accepted study's results according to its own criteria.

According to OECD Council Decision C(97)186/Final, chemical testing data generated in any OECD member country following OECD Test Guidelines and GLP principles is recognized by other OECD member countries, such as Australia, Canada, Korea, and the USA. This recognition also extends to some non-OECD countries that fully adhere to the mutual acceptance of data (MAD) under OECD Council Decision C(97)114/Final, including Brazil, India, Malaysia, Singapore, and South Africa, as well as Argentina for industrial chemicals, pesticides, and biocides only.

In June 2004, the US FDA published a comparison chart of FDA and EPA Good Laboratory Practice (GLP) regulations alongside OECD Principles for GLP, aiding in understanding the key differences and similarities in GLP standards across these regulatory bodies.

Note, unlike many countries, the US EPA names its mandated use of the OECD TG, ‘the EPA Test Methods’.

== See also ==
- Clinical Laboratory Improvement Amendments (CLIA)
- GxP
- Good clinical practice
- Good Automated Manufacturing Practice
- Joint Committee for Traceability in Laboratory Medicine
- International Laboratory Accreditation Cooperation
- International Federation of Clinical Chemistry and Laboratory Medicine (IFCC)
- Drug development
- ISO 15189
- Verification and Validation
