= Monvalle =

- Comune
- Comune di Monvalle

- Location within Italy Location within Lombardy
- Coordinates: 45°51′N 8°38′E
- Country: Italy
- Region: Lombardy
- Province: Province of Varese (VA)

Area
  - Total: 4.1 km^{2} (1.6 sq mi)

Population (Dec. 2004)
  - Total: 1,812
  - Density: 440/km^{2} (1,100/sq mi)
- Time zone: UTC+1 (CET)
  - Summer (DST): UTC+2 (CEST)
- Postal code: 21020
- Dialing code: 0332

Monvalle is a comune (municipality) in the Province of Varese in the Italian region of Lombardy, located about 60 kilometres (37 mi) northwest of Milan and about 15 kilometres (9 mi) west of Varese. As of 31 December 2004, it had a population of 1,812 and an area of 4.1 square kilometres (1.6 mi^{2}).

Monvalle borders the following municipalities: Besozzo, Leggiuno.

== Population trend ==
Historical population

Year	Pop.	±%
1861	760	—
1871	760	+0.0%
1881	873	+14.9%
1901	1,083	+24.1%
1911	1,142	+5.4%

Year	Pop.	±%
1921	1,132	−0.9%
1931	1,090	−3.7%
1936	941	−13.7%
1951	930	−1.2%
1961	1,051	+13.0%

Year	Pop.	±%
1971	1,242	+18.2%
1981	1,323	+6.5%
1991	1,506	+13.8%
2001	1,720	+14.2%

Source: Data from ISTAT
