= Petten =

Village in the Netherlands

- Village
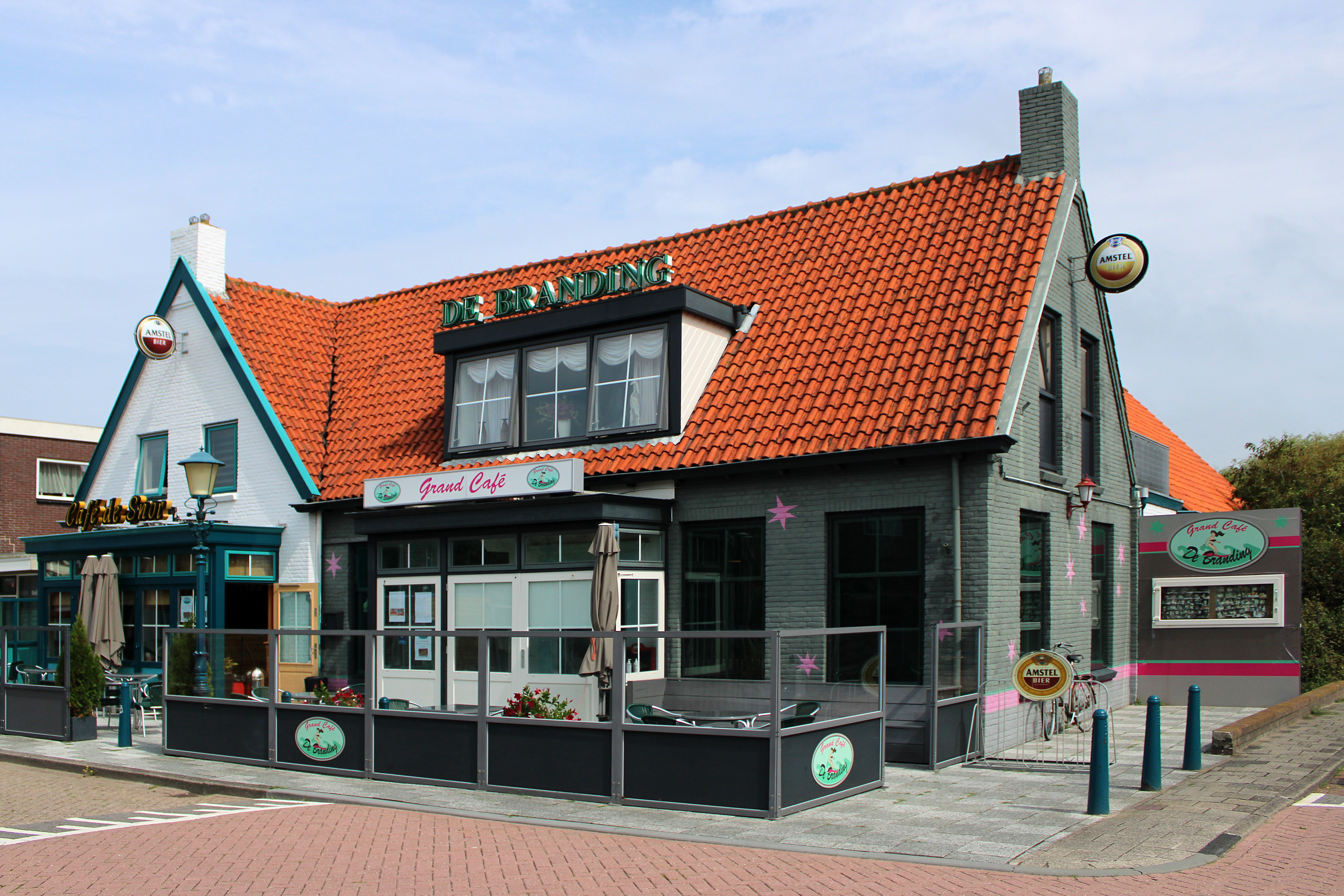
- Pub in Petten

- Coat of arms

- Location in the Netherlands Location in the province of North Holland in the Netherlands
- Coordinates: 52°46′N 4°40′E
- Country: Netherlands
- Province: North Holland
- Municipality: Schagen

Area
  - Village: 7.17 km^{2} (2.77 sq mi)
- Elevation: 0.4 m (1.3 ft)

Population (2025)
  - Village: 1,545
  - Density: 215/km^{2} (558/sq mi)
  - Urban: 1,465
  - Rural: 80
- Time zone: UTC+1 (CET)
  - Summer (DST): UTC+2 (CEST)
- Postal code: 1755
- Dialing code: 0226

Petten is a village in the Dutch province of North Holland. It is a part of the municipality of Schagen, and lies about 15 km northwest of Alkmaar, on the North Sea. The population is ca. 1900.

Petten's economy is based on agriculture (bulb cultivation), and tourism. A particular type sand can be found on the beach of Petten, of sanded quartz with granite. Since 1997 a plan has been developed for a marina with 600 places; called Marina Petten.

Somewhat to the south of Petten, the dunes have been eroded, as a result of which a dike had to be built, the Hondsbossche and Pettemer zeewering.

== History ==
Petten could have been founded in 739. The name refers to the three wells (Dutch: putten) which are located there. There was already a mention of a sand dike in 1388 between Petten and 't Oghe (Callantsoog). In the St. Elizabeth's flood (1421), Petten was entirely washed away, and the dunes were damaged. A sleeper dike was built behind the dunes in 1432 and from 1506 active coastal defense took place, with pile heads of beams from Norway and Sweden and stone from Vilvoorde, Belgium. Even so, more than 100 houses were washed away in 1625, plus the church of Petten. The construction of the Hondsbossche zeewering began in 1793.

Petten belonged to the nobility of Petten en Nolmerban, and then became a municipality. In 1929, the municipality of Petten was incorporated into the municipality of Zijpe. Last one merged with Harenkarspel and Schagen into the new municipality of Schagen in 2013. During the Second World War, the entire town of Petten was broken up in 1943 by order of the German Wehrmacht because of the construction of the Atlantic Wall. The church of Petten was demolished in 1944. After the war, a whole new town was built from 1946, designed by the architects Van de Ban and De Vassy. In 1955, the foundation "Reactor Centrum Nederland" (RCN) was set up, that went on to build a research-reactor (Petten nuclear reactor) that currently supplies 60% of European demand for medical radioisotopes. Since 1976, the foundation is called the Energy research Centre of the Netherlands (ECN).

In December 1962 (according to some accounts 1963), the Fluxus artist Wim T. Schippers emptied a bottle of Green Spot lemonade in the sea at Petten ("Manifestatie Aan Het Strand Te Petten").

On 11 December 2004, an approximately three-year-old basking shark, Cetorhinus maximus, was beached on the coast near Petten. The animal was 3.65 m long and weighed 250 kg. The corpse was put on ice and was exhibited in the aquarium of Fort Kijkduin at Den Helder. Attempts are being made to place the basking shark in its entirety in a formalin solution.

== Gallery ==
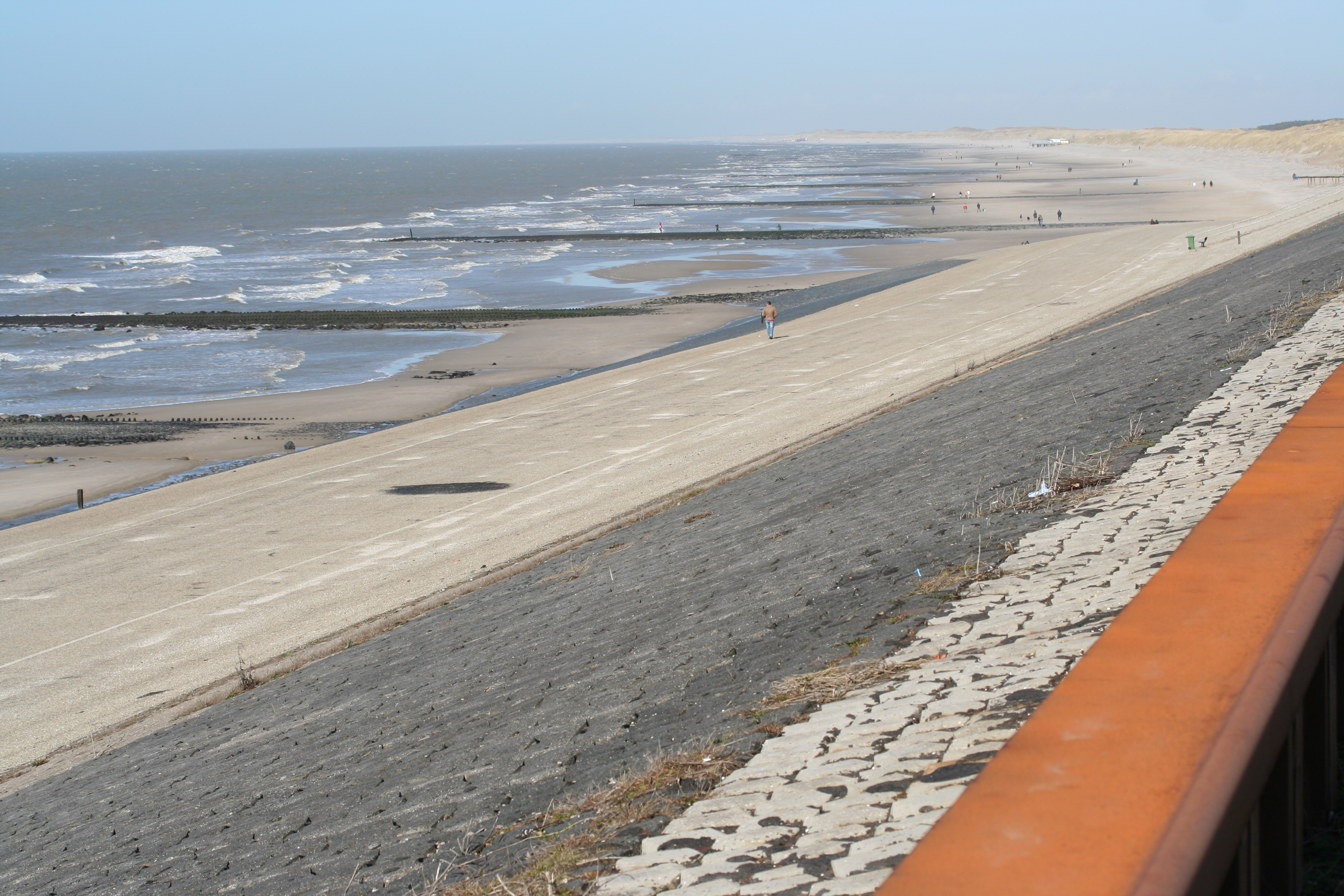
Beach at Petten, from the Pettemer zeewering.

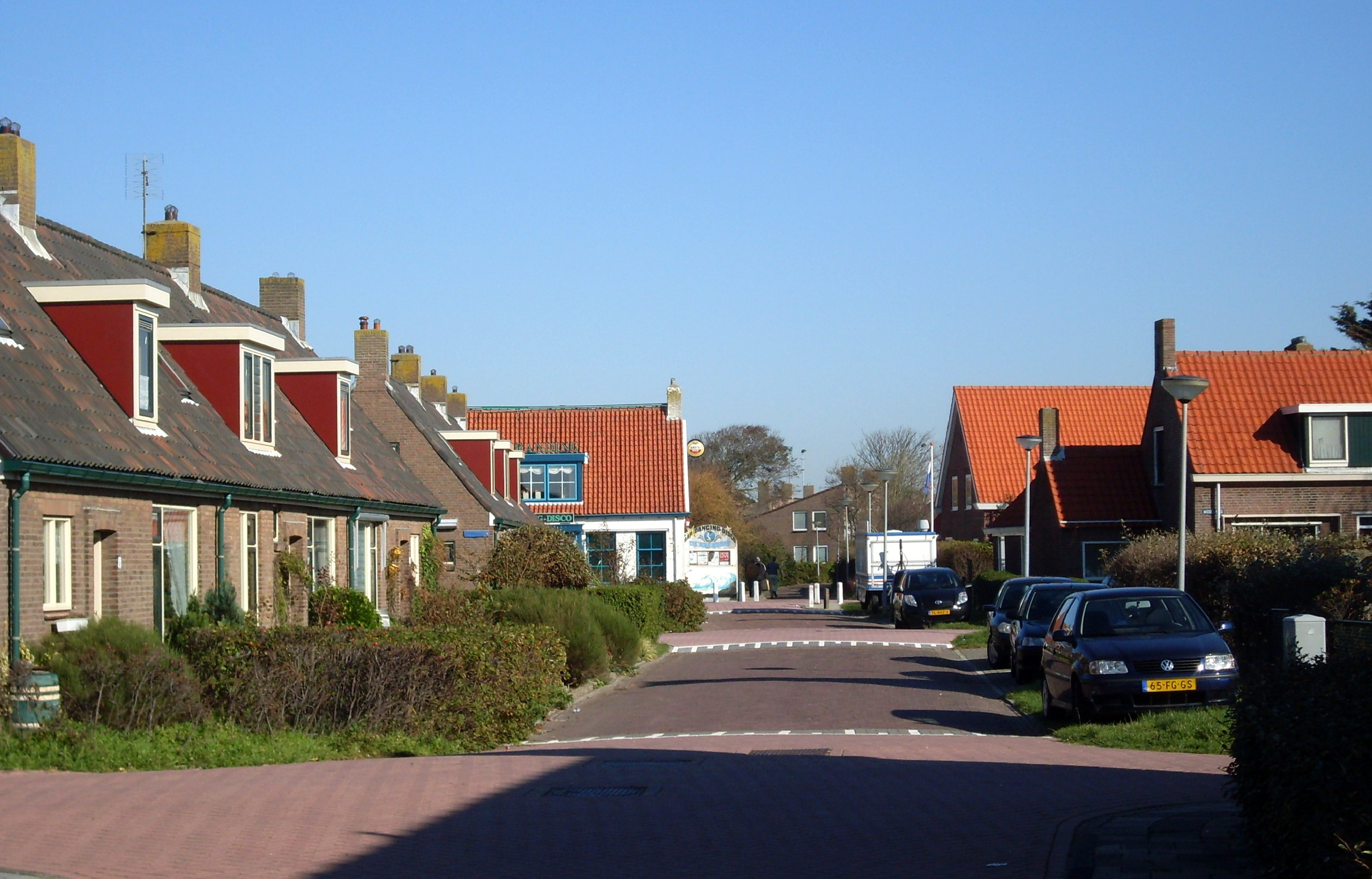
Street view

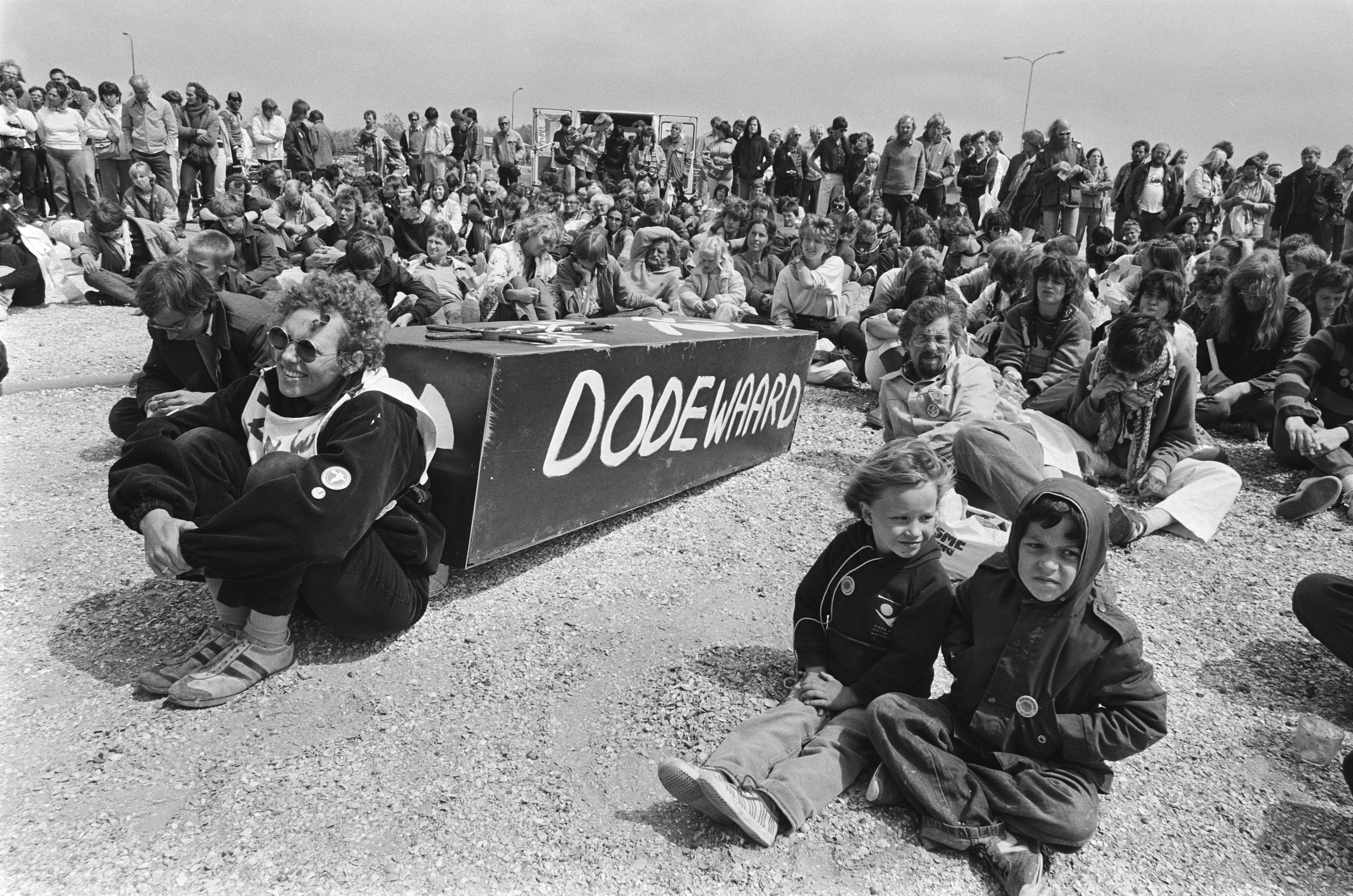
Protests against dumping radioactive waste in the sea

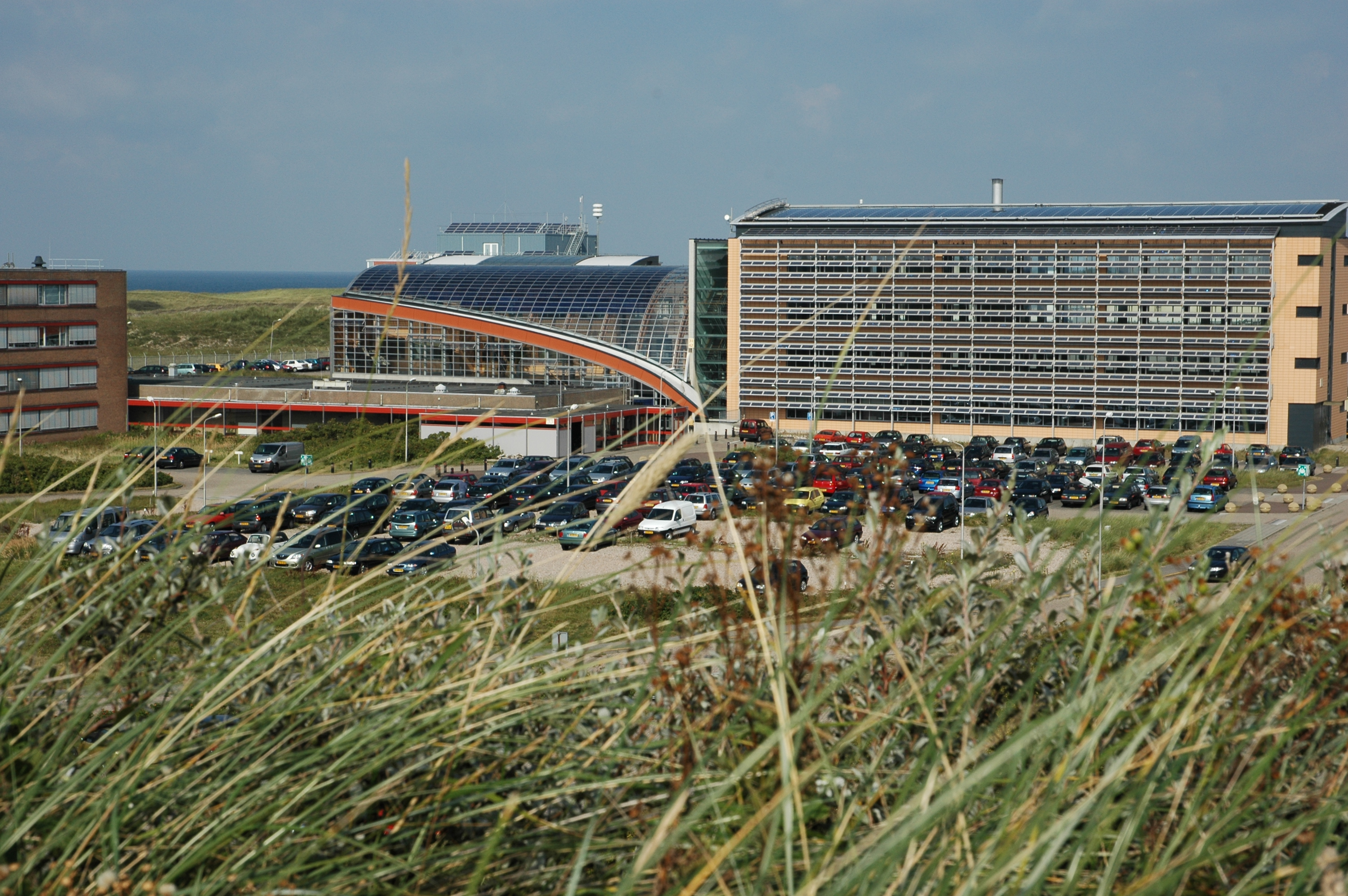
Petten nuclear reactor
