= Institute for Environment and Sustainability =

Italian-based research institute

The Institute for Environment and Sustainability (IES) used to be a specialised institute of the Joint Research Centre (JRC) directorate of the European Commission, based in Ispra, Italy. Its mission was to provide scientific and technical support to EU policies for the protection of the environment contributing to sustainable development in Europe.

The Joint Research Centre underwent a reorganization in 2016, where the work of the scientific institutes was redistributed among scientific Directorates.
