= Institute for Health and Consumer Protection =

Italian research institute

Coordinates: 45.8114°N 8.6285°E

The Institute for Health and Consumer Protection or IHCP, located in Ispra, Italy, is one of the seven institutes of the Joint Research Centre (JRC), a Directorate-General of the European Commission (EC).

The Institute for Health and Consumer Protection provides scientific support to the development and implementation of European Union policies related to health and consumer protection. The institute carries out research to improve the understanding of potential health risks posed by chemicals, biocides, genetically modified organisms, contaminants released from food contact materials and consumer products.

== See also ==
- Directorate-General for Research (European Commission)
- Joint Research Centre (European Commission)
