= Ispra =

- Comune
- Comune di Ispra
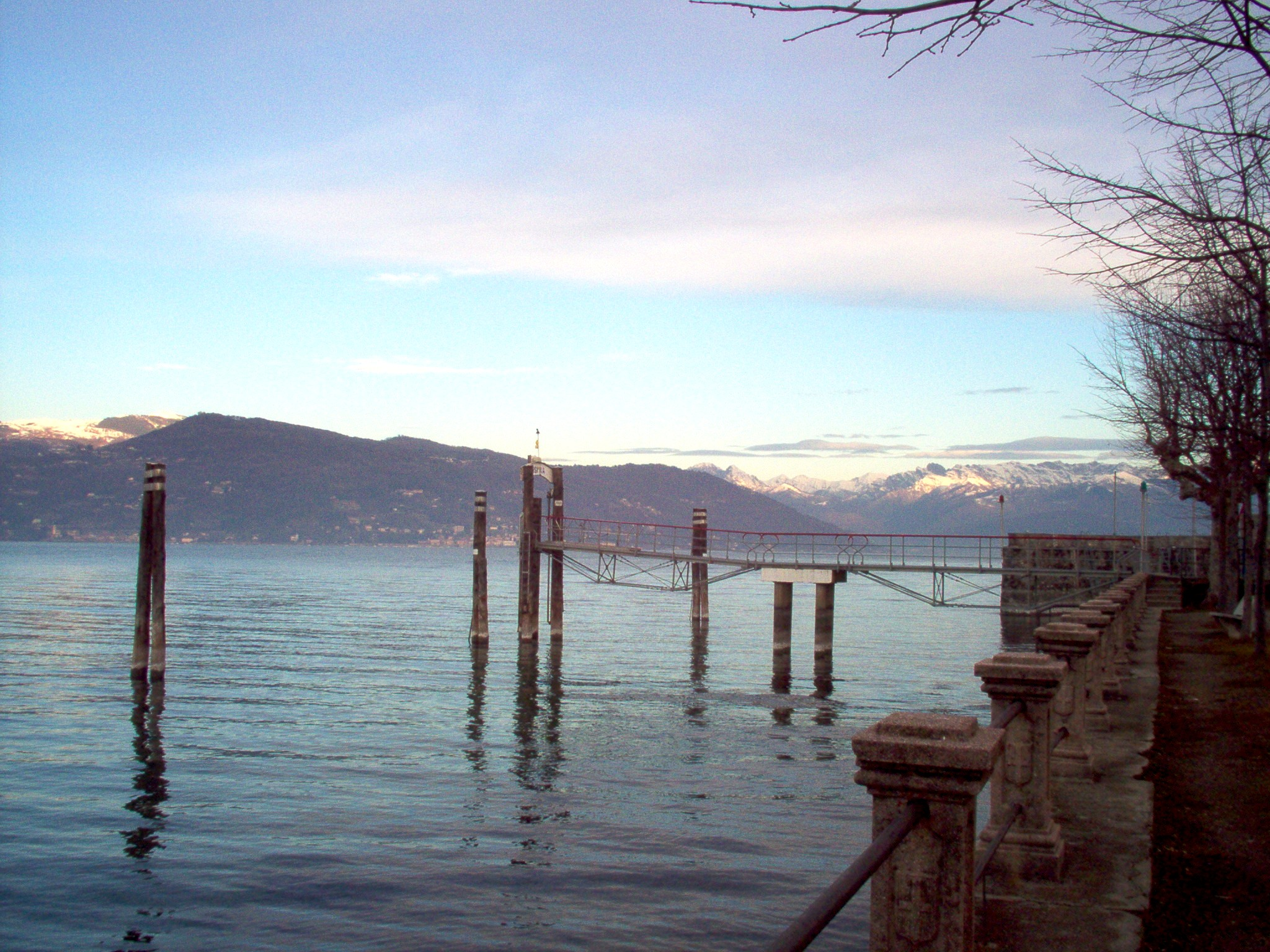
- Lake Maggiore seen from Ispra.

- Coat of arms

- Location within Italy Location within Lombardy
- Coordinates: 45°48′50″N 08°36′43″E
- Country: Italy
- Region: Lombardy
- Province: Varese (VA)
- Frazioni: Barza, Cascine, Quassa

Government
  - Mayor: Rosalina Di Spirito

Area
  - Total: 15 km^{2} (5.8 sq mi)
- Elevation: 220 m (720 ft)

Population (31 January 2009)
  - Total: 5,086
  - Density: 340/km^{2} (880/sq mi)
- Demonym: Ispresi
- Time zone: UTC+1 (CET)
  - Summer (DST): UTC+2 (CEST)
- Postal code: 21027
- Dialing code: 0332
- Patron saint: St. Martin of Tours
- Saint day: 11 November
- Website: Official website

Ispra is a comune and small town on the eastern coast of Lake Maggiore, in the province of Varese (Lombardy, northern Italy).

== History ==
The research centre in Ispra originally belonged to the Comitato Nazionale per l'Energia Nucleare (CNEN) and was officially transferred to the European Community on 1 March 1961. Since 1973, non-nuclear research evolved rapidly, especially in topics related to safety and the environment. After 16 years of research, the nuclear reactor at JRC Ispra was shut down in 1983.

== Toponymy ==
Attested by the name Ispira (712), Ispira (XIV). Appears as Ispratium in Aegidius Tschudi's Beschreibung Galliae Comatae. According to Gaudenzio Merula the origin of the name could lie onto the rocky nature of this landscape; Hisprum quasi asperum ob saxorum difficultates, that is to say equivalent to the Latin hispida (cf. hispid and ispido) and related to the Provençal ispre with the "d" shifting to an "r" due to rhotacism.

== Joint Research Centre ==
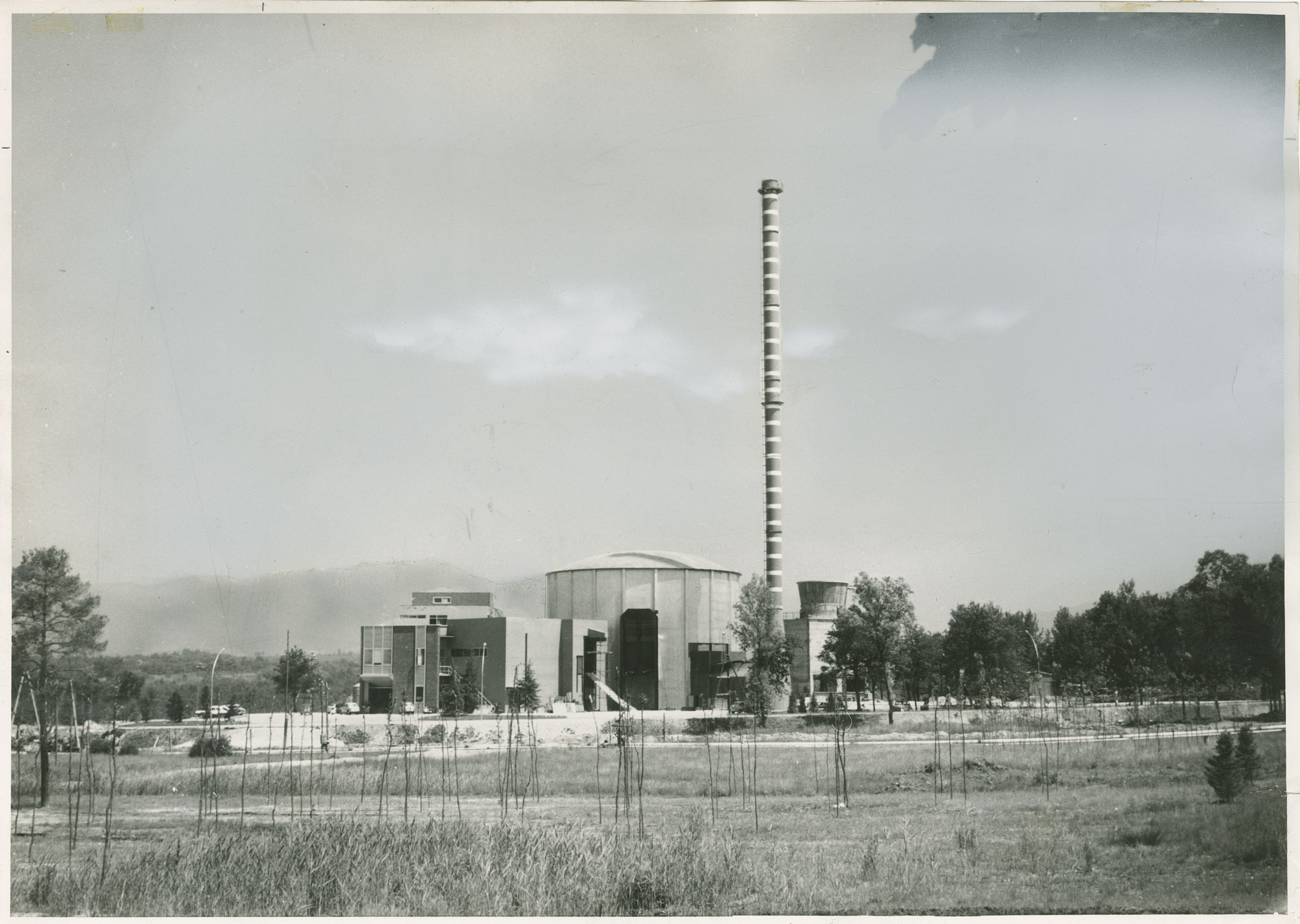
Nuclear Research Center of Ispra - the building complex of the Ispra-1 reactor in 1959

Some of the main Institutes of the Joint Research Centre (JRC) of the European Commission (EC) are located there, including the Institute for the Protection and the Security of the Citizen (IPSC), the Institute for Environment and Sustainability (IES) and the Institute for Health and Consumer Protection (IHCP), as well as the Ispra site Directorate (IS).

Locally, the research establishment is referred to as the CCR (Centro Comune di Ricerca) or as EURATOM - based on its history in nuclear research. The site covers an area of 157 hectares (390 acres), where the original presence of pines, birches, oaks and chestnut trees has partially been preserved.

The site still contains a number of experimental nuclear reactors in the process of being decommissioned.

=== Gallery ===
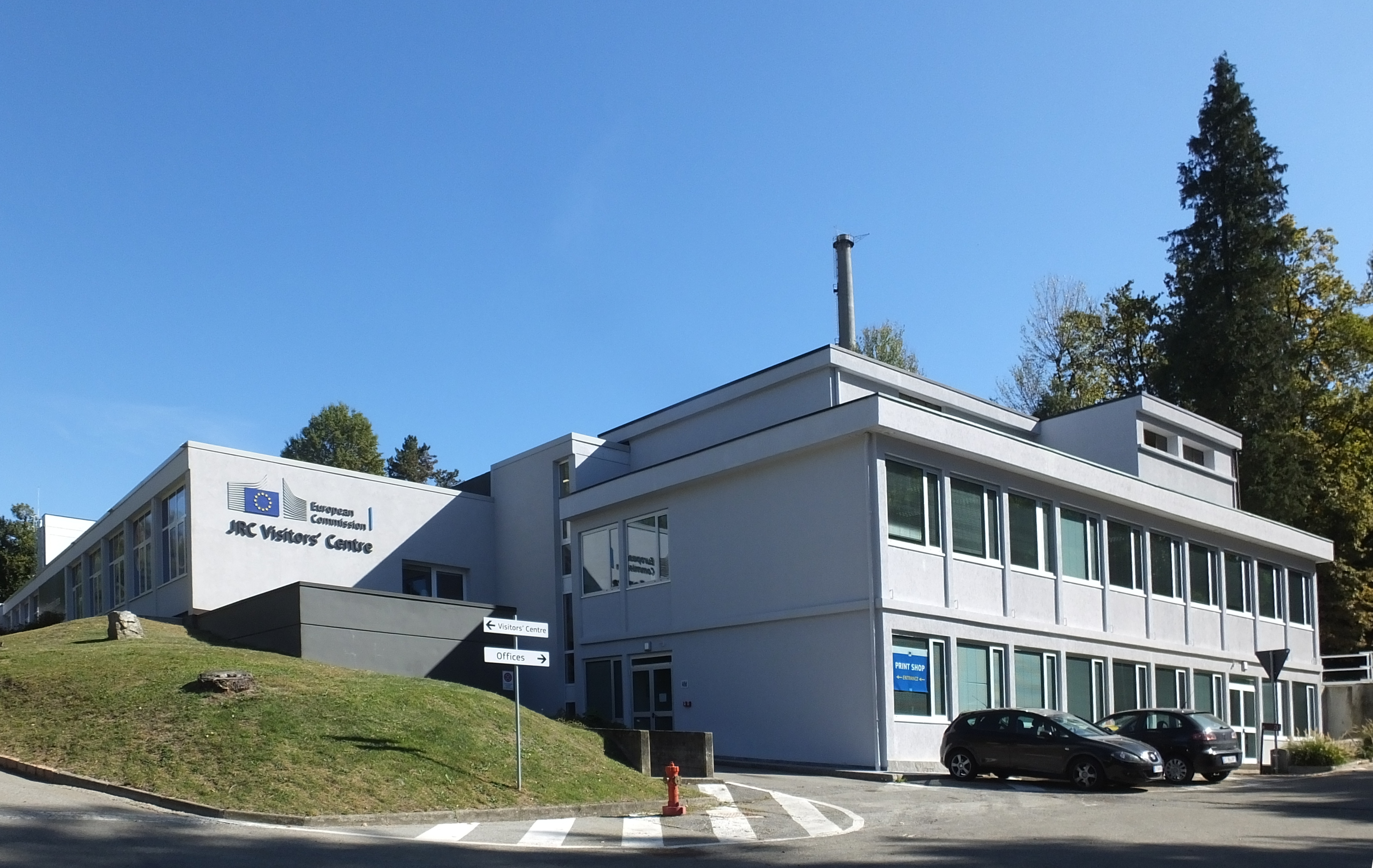
JRC Ispra visitors centre

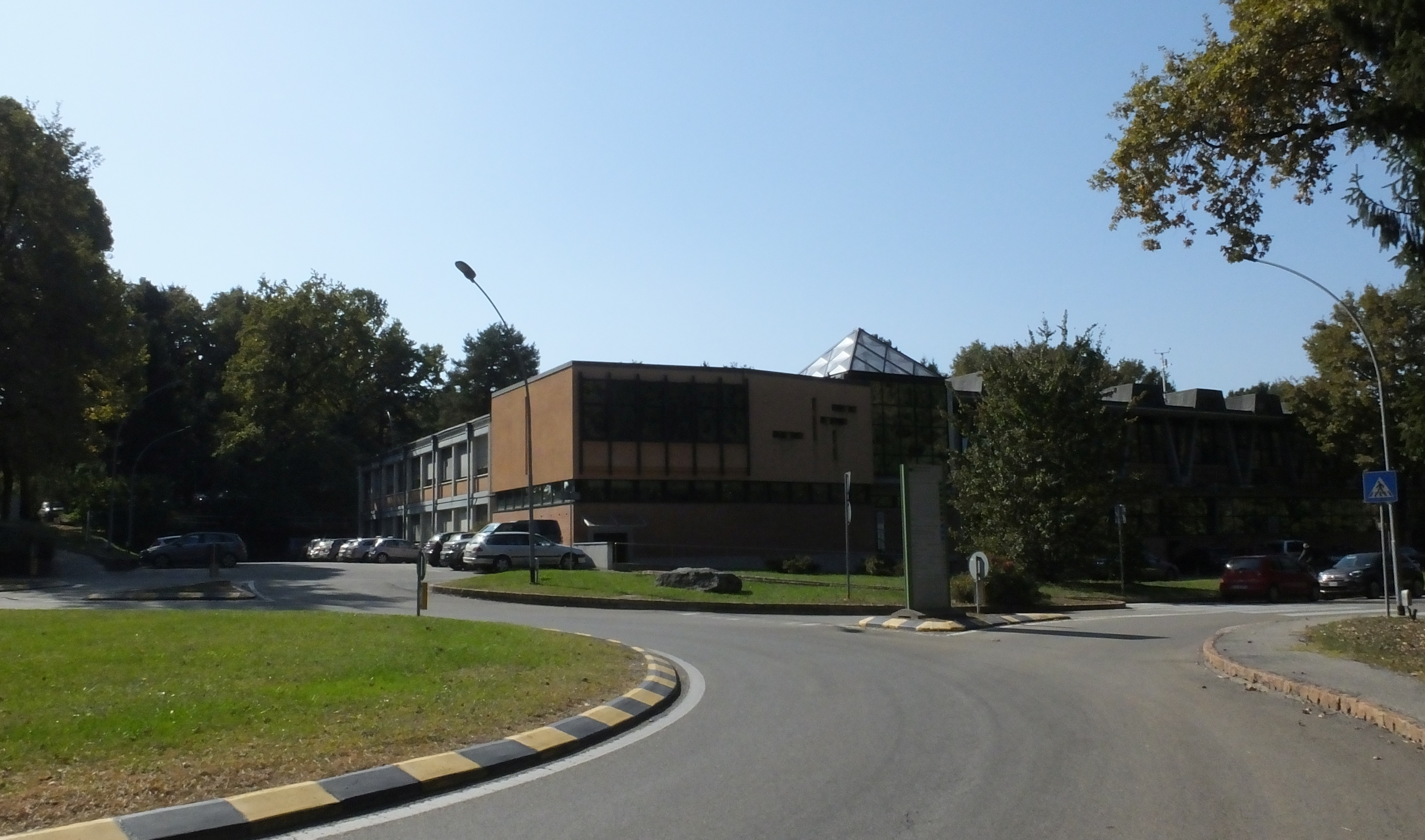
The JRC conference centre on via Francia

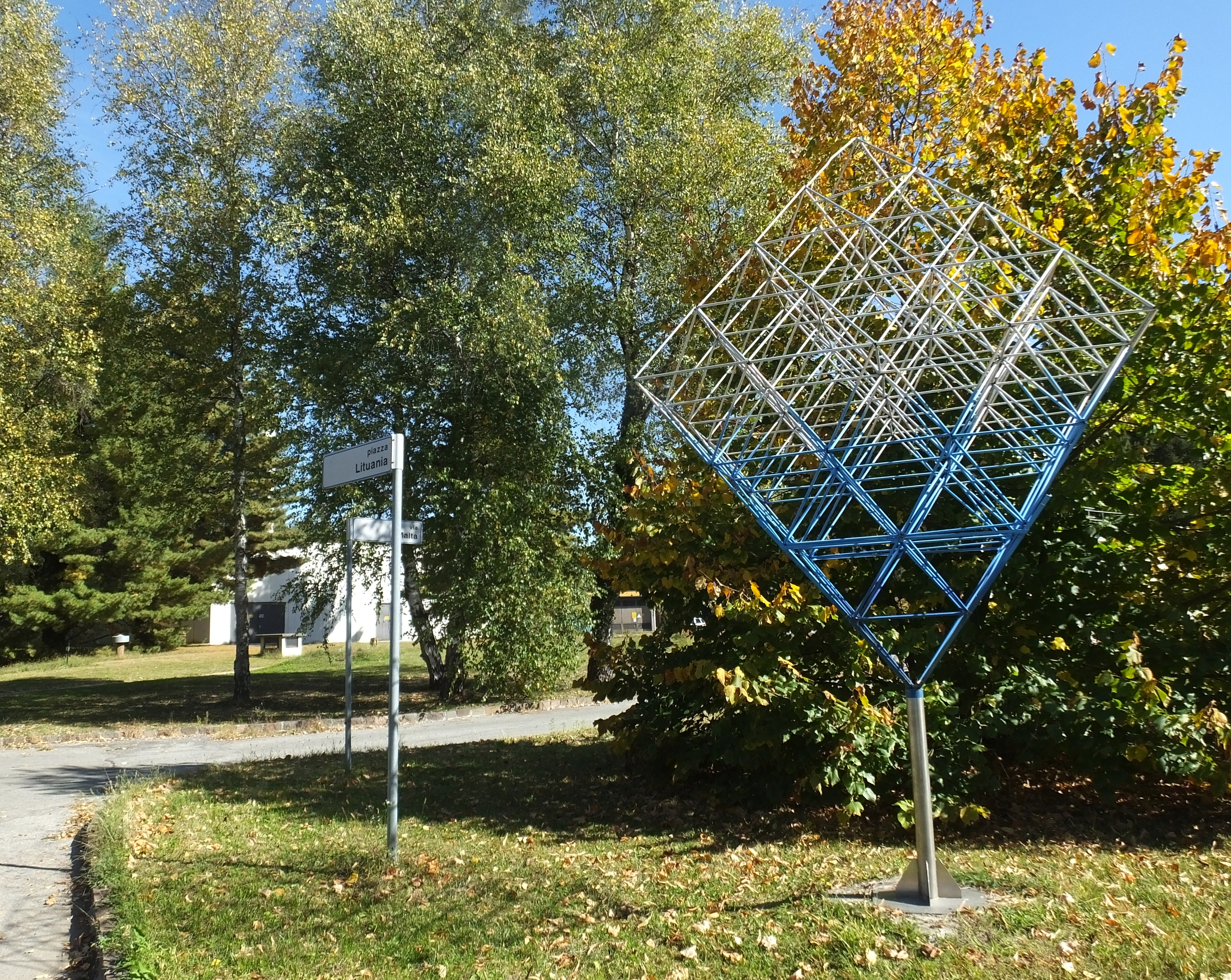
lithuanian square sculpture

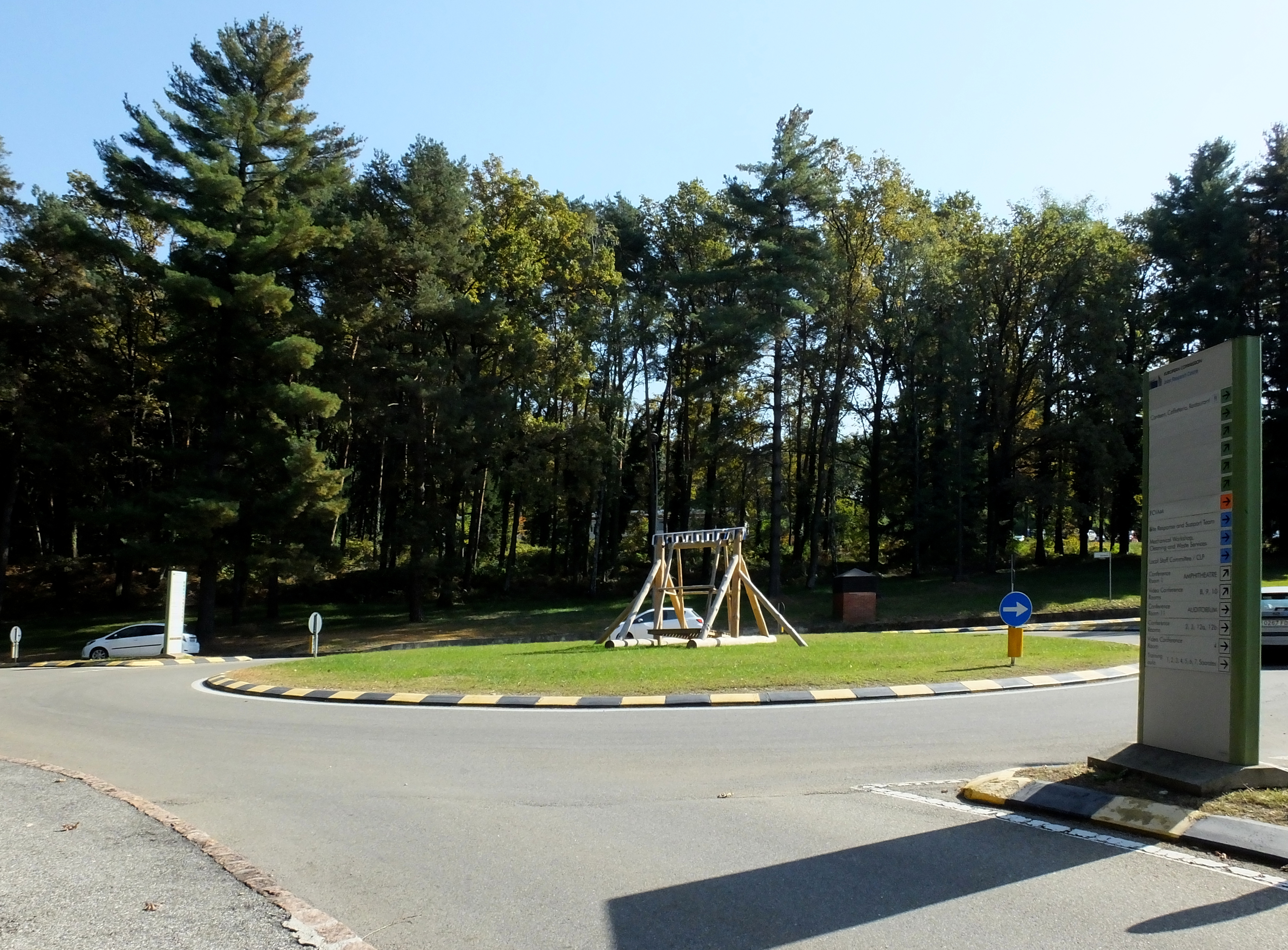
The intersection of via Francia and via Germania

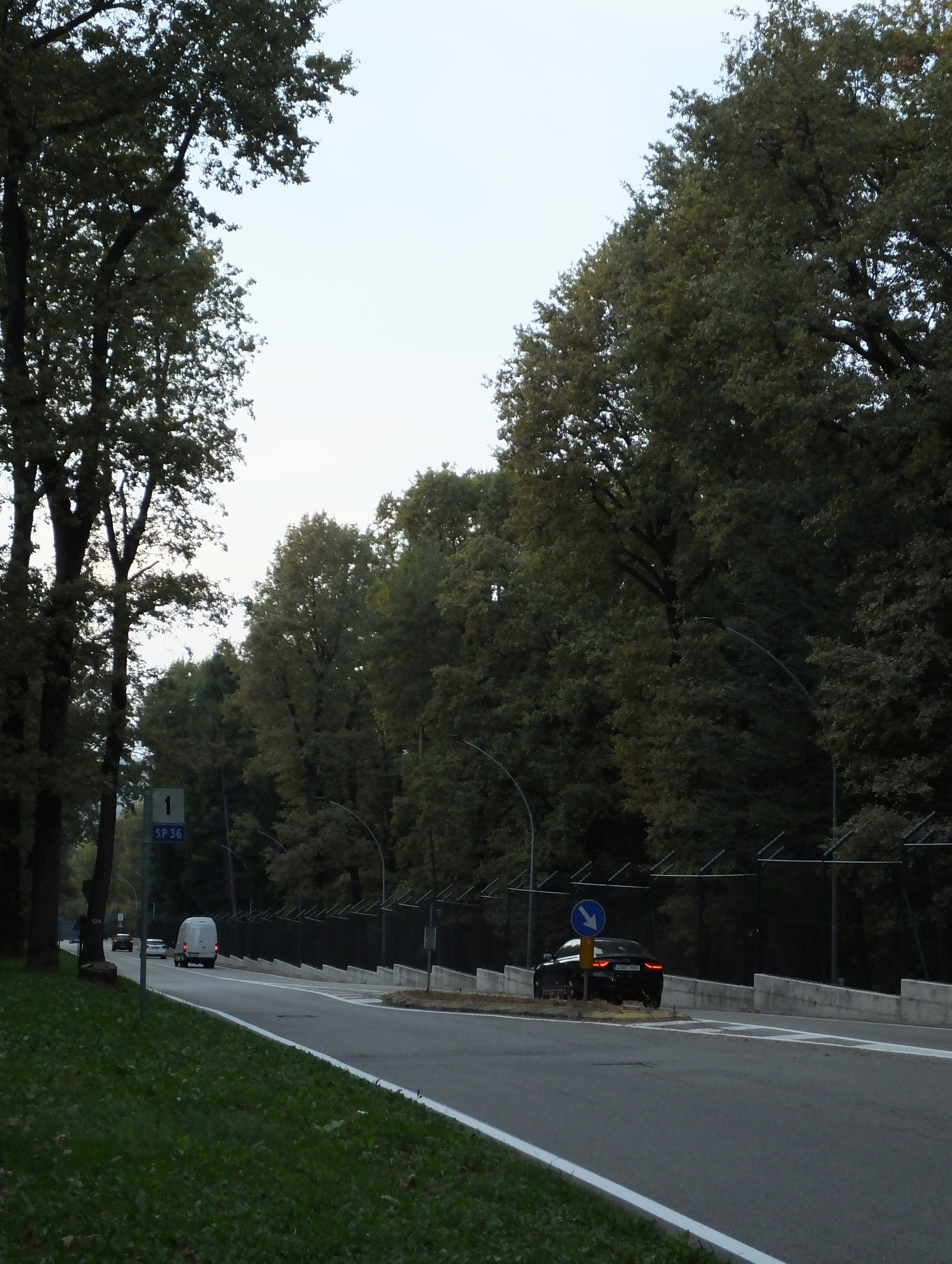
Via Enrico Fermi at JRC Ispra

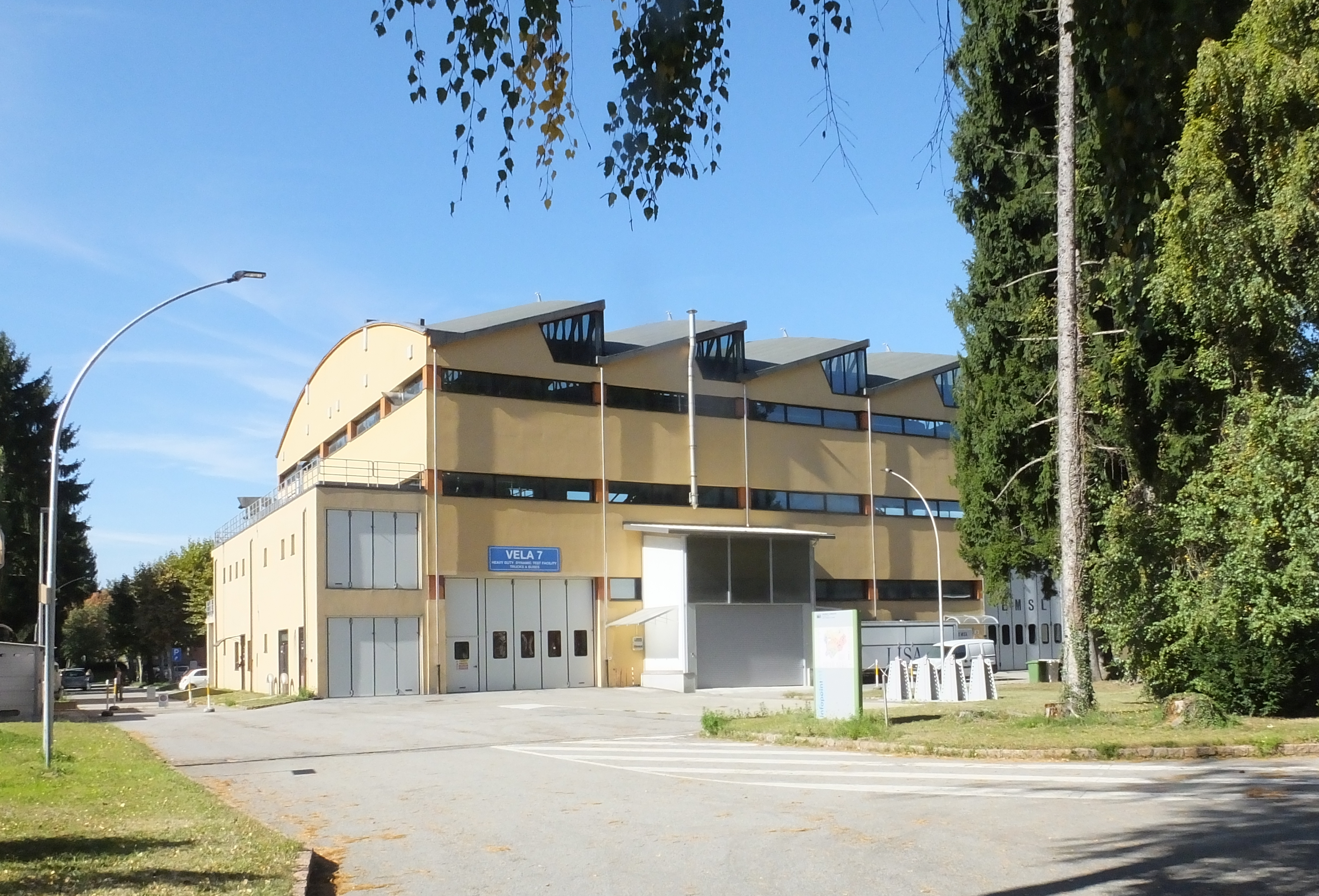
The Vehicle Emissions Laboratory (VELA) centre at JRC Ispra

== Famous descendants ==
The Italian-American ballerina Enrica Soma (the mother of actress Anjelica Huston) was born to parents who had immigrated to the U.S. from Ispra.
