= European science programme =

European science programme may refer to:

- Science and technology in Europe
- Framework Programmes for Research and Technological Development of the European Union, including their current (2021-2027) 9th iteration, the Horizon Europe
  - European Innovation Council
  - European Institute of Innovation and Technology
  - European Research Area (ERA)
  - European Research Council (ERC)
  - European Research Executive Agency
- Erasmus+
- European Space Agency Science Programme
