= European Innovation Council =

Promotion agency of the European Union

The European Innovation Council (EIC) was introduced by the European Commission to support the commercialization of high-risk, high-impact technologies in the European Union. The fully-fledged EIC was launched March 2021 under Horizon Europe and is incorporated within the European Innovation Council and SMEs Executive Agency (EISMEA). Its goal is to aid researchers, start-ups and SMEs bring their innovations to market by providing funding, networking and partnership opportunities, and business acceleration services. In its latest form, the concept has been put forth by the EU Research Commissioner Carlos Moedas in mid-2015. The EIC has a budget of €10.1 billion to support innovations throughout the lifecycle from early stage research, to proof of concept, technology transfer, and the financing and scale up of start-ups and SMEs.

== Pilot Phase (2018–2021) ==
The EIC pilot phase was launched in 2018, incorporating existing instruments under the Horizon 2020 programme, in particular the SME instrument and Future & Emerging Technology (FET) programme. These funding schemes were brought together in single work programme to provide direct support to innovators throughout Europe.

The EIC pilot phase, together with the existing instruments, supported:

- Over 430 projects on Future and Emerging Technologies, involving over 2,700 partners. These projects have generated over 3000 peer reviewed scientific articles, over 600 innovations, and over 100 patents.
- Over 5,700 startups and SMEs, who have raised over €5 billion in follow up investments (3 euro for every euro from the EU budget) and on average, more than doubled the number of employees in a 2-year period.

== Funding Opportunities ==
=== EIC Pathfinder ===
The EIC Pathfinder programme supports the research of ideas for radically new technologies. Applicants participating in EIC Pathfinder projects are typically scientists, entrepreneurial researchers and, research organisations, start-ups, high-tech SMEs and industrial stakeholders interested in technological research and innovation. Grants of up to €3–4 million support early stage development of future technologies up to proof of concept.

=== EIC Transition ===
Building on technologies generated by Pathfinder, the EIC Transition funds innovation activities that go beyond the experimental proof of principle in laboratory to supports both:

- the maturation and validation of novel technology in the lab and in relevant application environments
- the development of a business case and (business) model towards the innovation's future commercialisation.

Grants of up to €2.5 million and more are available to validate and demonstrate technology in application-relevant environment and develop market readiness.

=== EIC Accelerator ===
The EIC Accelerator supports individual Small and Medium Enterprises (SMEs), in particular start-ups and spinout companies to develop and scale up game-changing innovations, from TRL5 to market deployment and scale-up. In some cases small mid-caps (up to 500 employees) are supported.

The EIC Accelerator provides substantial financial support, with a combination of:

- grant funding (non-dilutive) of up to €2.5 million for innovation development costs (TRL5 to 8);
- an investments (usually direct equity investments) of up to €15 million managed by the EIC Fund for market deployment and scale up (TRL9 onwards)

The EIC Accelerator covers all areas of technology, with the goal to support the development and effective deployment of any European innovation benefiting Europeans, economically or socially. It is the first instrument developed on the idea that Europe needs to ascertain its "sovereignty" or "strategic autonomy" over technologies.

In addition, EIC selected companies receive coaching, mentoring, access to investors and corporates, and many other opportunities as part of the EIC community.

=== The EIC Fund ===
The EIC Fund is new feature of the EIC, introduced in 2020 under the Pilot phase. The EIC Fund provides in the form of equity from €0.5 million to €15 million the investment component awarded under the EIC Accelerator to selected breakthrough innovation companies. The EIC Fund is a unique entity owned by the European Union represented by the European Commission and established to make direct equity investments in companies.

The EIC Fund:

- Provides patient capital in the form of equity or quasi-equity (which may also be blended with a grant component) to SMEs and start-ups selected through the highly competitive and rigorous EIC Accelerator.
- Bridges the funding gap for start-ups with seed capital to series B financing, where market entry is at most in a pilot phase to prepare the scaling up of breakthrough European innovations.
- Aims to crowd in other investors, further sharing risks by building a large network of capital providers and strategic partners suitable for co-investments and follow on funding

== EIC Ambassadors ==
A number of influential innovators are chosen as EIC Ambassadors to speak about the EIC and its impacts and developments in local, national, and European media, and to support the improvement of the EIC with their insights and feedback. There are currently 33 EIC Ambassadors for 2021–2027:

- Kerstin Bock, co-founder & CEO of Openers
- Irina Borodina, co-founder and CTO of BioPhero
- Jo Bury, managing director of Flanders Institute of Biotechnology
- Paddy Cosgrave, founder and CEO of Web Summit
- Cristian Dascalu, founder or co-founder of several businesses and projects
- Dermot Diamond, Professor of Sensor Science and Materials Chemistry
- Gráinne Dwyer, co-founder of Stori Creative
- Angele Giuliano, CEO of AcrossLimits
- Jim Hagemann Snabe, Chair Siemens AG, Chair AP Moller Maersk A/S
- Marjolein Helder, CEO of Plant-e
- Taavet Hinrikus, Chairman of Wise
- Ingmar Hoerr, founder and chairman of the supervisory board of CureVac
- Fredrik Hörstedt, Director at Vinnova
- Talis Juhna, Professor and vice-rector for research at Riga Technical University
- Bindi Karia, European Innovation Expert & Advisor
- Stavriana A. Kofteros, Vice Chair of the Research & Innovation Foundation
- Jana Kolar, executive director of CERIC-ERIC
- Krisztina Kovacs-Schreiner, CEO of Lixea
- Jerzy Langer, Physicist
- Alexandru Müller, Head of the Microwave Laboratory with IMT-Bucharest
- Valeria Nicolosi, Professor of Nanomaterials & Advanced Microscopy
- Carlos Oliveira, Executive President of José Neves Foundation
- Veronika Oudova, CEO & Co-founder of S-Biomedic
- César Pascual García, Lead Research Associate at Luxembourg Institute of Science and Technology
- Raycho Raychev, founder & CEO of EnduroSat
- Or Retzkin, CEO and co-founder of EyeControl
- Marie-Elisabeth Rusling, Director at AURA srl
- Emmanuel Stratakis, founder and CEO of Biomimetic PC
- Constantijn van Oranje, Leader of Techleap.nl
- Roxanne Varza, Director of Station F
- Roberto Verganti, Professor of Leadership and Innovation
- Cristina Vicini-Rademacher, founder and CEO of Vicini Strategy
- Yousef Yousef, CEO of LG Sonic

== See also ==
- European Innovation Council and SMEs Executive Agency
- European Research Council (ERC)
- Framework Programmes for Research and Technological Development
- European Institute of Technology (EIT)
- European Research Area (ERA)
- Directorate-General for Research
- Directorate-General of the Joint Research Centre (European Commission)
- European Research Advisory Board (EURAB)
- European Council of Applied Sciences and Engineering (Euro-CASE)
- Information Society Technologies Advisory Group (ISTAG)
- Lisbon Strategy
