= Maria Cristina Russo =

- Education: Libera Università Internazionale degli Studi Sociali Guido Carli, College of Europe, Sapienza University of Rome
- Occupations: Deputy Director-General for Innovation, Prosperity and International Cooperation Directorate-General for Research and Innovation
- Years active: 1990 - present
- Employer: European Commission
- Children: 3

Maria Cristina Russo is a European Commission official, originally from Italy, who currently serves as Deputy Director-General for Innovation, Prosperity and International Cooperation in the Directorate-General for Research and Innovation (DG RTD) of the European Commission.

She has worked for the European Commission since 1992 and has held a number of senior positions covering research and innovation policy, international cooperation, interinstitutional relations and financial services.

== Career ==
Russo joined the European Commission in 1992 as a policy officer in the Directorate-General for External Relations, where she worked on relations with the newly independent states of the former Soviet Union. From 1995 to 1999, she worked in the Secretariat-General of the European Commission on relations with the Council of the European Union and the Committee of Permanent Representatives.

From 1999 to 2004, Russo was a member of the cabinet of European Commissioner for Research Philippe Busquin. During this period, she was involved in European research policy, including the development of the European Research Area.

Between 2004 and 2010, Russo served in the Secretariat-General as a head of unit, with responsibilities including relations with the Council, co-decision procedures and policy coordination concerning security and justice. From 2010 to 2013, she was Head of Unit for Financial Services and Redress in the Directorate-General for Health and Consumers.

In July 2013, Russo became Director for International Cooperation in the Directorate-General for Research and Innovation. In this position, she was responsible for developing and implementing the European Union's international strategy for research and innovation cooperation and for the international dimension of the EU's research and innovation framework programmes, including Horizon 2020 and Horizon Europe. Her work included cooperation with international partners in support of scientific excellence, industrial competitiveness and the EU's external policy objectives.

In May 2024, Russo became Director for Prosperity in DG Research and Innovation. In this role, she was responsible for areas including industrial research and innovation, industrial transformation, knowledge valorisation, Industry 5.0 and artificial intelligence in science. Her work included the development of European policies concerning advanced materials and industrial competitiveness.

In November 2025, the European Commission appointed Russo Deputy Director-General responsible for Innovation, Prosperity and International Cooperation in DG Research and Innovation. She took up the position in January 2026.

As Deputy Director-General, Russo is also Chief Negotiator for third countries’ Association to Horizon Europe, being also involved in the wider European Union's international research and innovation partnerships, including through science and technology partnerships, science diplomacy, and research security. To date, Horizon Europe has more than 20 countries associated around the world, with the latest to join being Australia, and India as the prospective next country to be associated.

== Education ==
Russo studied Political Sciences at LUISS Guido Carli University in Rome. She also holds a Law Degree from Sapienza Università di Roma and a Research master’s degree in European studies from the College of Europe in Bruges.

== Personal life ==
Maria Cristina Russo is from Rome, Italy. She is the mother of three children.

== See also ==
- Directorate-General for Research and Innovation
- Horizon Europe
