= Scaleup Europe Fund =

Investment fund for technology companies

The Scaleup Europe Fund is a planned European growth and late-stage investment fund for financing technology companies in strategic sectors. It was initiated by the European Commission together with institutional investors and is intended to support European scaleup companies with larger equity investments. The fund has a target volume of around €5 billion; according to the European Innovation Council, first investments are expected in autumn 2026.

== Background ==
The fund was created against the background of a financing gap frequently identified in the European Union for young technology companies in later growth stages. Although numerous start-ups and research-based companies emerge in Europe, the European Commission has stated that they often face difficulties in closing sufficiently large financing rounds within Europe. As a result, companies seeking to scale are often dependent on capital from other regions of the world. One reason for this is the relatively small size of most European venture capital firms and the lack of experience or reluctance on the part of institutional investors such as pension funds. Major startups such as Spotify, UiPath, and Klarna were founded in Europe but are listed on the New York Stock Exchange.

The initiative is part of the European Startup and Scaleup Strategy. Reuters placed the announcement of the fund in 2025 in the context of the EU’s effort to narrow Europe’s gap with the United States and China in the financing of fast-growing technology companies. According to Reuters, late-stage financing for scale-ups in the United States was significantly higher than in Europe.

== Operation ==
The Scaleup Europe Fund is designed as a public-private investment vehicle. The European Commission participates as a founding investor, while further capital is to come from private and institutional investors. The fund is integrated into the existing umbrella structure of the EIC Fund, but is to be managed by an independent, privately organised fund manager.

In May 2026, the Swedish investment firm EQT was selected as the preferred investment adviser and fund manager. According to EQT, the fund is intended to invest in European technology companies in the European Union and in countries associated with Horizon Europe. Areas mentioned included digital systems, industrial technologies and life sciences companies.

In addition to the European Commission, founding investors include Novo Holdings, EIFO, CriteriaCaixa, Santander/Mouro Capital, Fondazione Compagnia di San Paolo, Intesa Sanpaolo, Fondazione Cariplo, APG Asset Management on behalf of the Dutch pension fund ABP, Wallenberg Investments and Allianz. In June 2026, Novo Holdings announced a €500 million commitment to the fund. A total of 20 percent of the €5 billion in seed capital comes from the Horizon Europe component of the European Innovation Council, and the remaining 80 percent from private investors.

== Purpose ==
The purpose of the fund is to provide larger European technology companies with access to growth capital and thereby anchor them more strongly in Europe. According to the European Innovation Council, the fund is intended to enable larger European-led financing rounds and reduce the dependence of European scale-ups on non-European investors.

The fund targets strategic technology areas. The European Innovation Council lists, among others, artificial intelligence, quantum technologies, semiconductors, robotics and autonomous systems, green energy, space, biotechnology, medical technology, advanced materials and agritech. In this respect, the fund pursues not only the financing of individual companies but also industrial and technology policy objectives, particularly the strengthening of European competitiveness in key technologies.

The fund is intended to invest primarily in companies in the growth, late-growth and pre-IPO stages. According to Novo Holdings, typical investment sizes are expected to exceed €100 million, including follow-on financing. The investments are to be made mainly as direct equity investments; substantial minority stakes and active roles in portfolio companies are envisaged.

== Reception ==
The Jacques Delors Centre assessed the Scaleup Europe Fund as a possible bridging instrument for closing an important financing gap in the European venture capital market. It stated that the fund could combine large equity investments with a stronger focus on strategically relevant sectors. At the same time, it noted that the fund alone could not remedy the structural weaknesses of the European venture capital and capital market environment. Further policy measures must be taken to further develop the EU's venture capital ecosystem, make listings on local stock exchanges more attractive, and facilitate cross-border investment

The publication ScienceBusiness described the fund in June 2026 as a particularly rapidly established European scale-up fund and highlighted that it was intended to enable significantly larger investments than previous EIC instruments. One point of criticism in the debate concerned whether funds from the Horizon Europe research framework programme should be redirected to the fund. ScienceBusiness reported that the Turkish research agency TÜBİTAK criticised such plans, arguing that associated countries might have less direct access to funding under such an arrangement.
