= Marie Skłodowska-Curie Actions =

European research fellowships

The Marie Skłodowska-Curie Actions (MSCA; named after Marie Skłodowska-Curie) are major research fellowships created by the European Union / European Commission to support research in the European Research Area (ERA). The Marie Skłodowska-Curie Actions are among Europe's most competitive and prestigious research and innovation fellowships.

== Overview ==
Established in 1996 as Marie Curie Actions and known since 2014 as Marie Skłodowska-Curie Actions, they aim to foster the career development and further training of researchers at all career stages. The Marie Skłodowska-Curie Actions promote interdisciplinary research and international collaborations, supporting scientists from not only within Europe but also across the globe.

Marie Skłodowska-Curie Actions are currently financed through the ninth Framework Programme for Research and Technological Development (called Horizon Europe) and belong to the so-called 'first pillar' of Horizon: "Excellent Science." Through this funding scheme, the European Research Executive Agency (REA) has devoted €6.6 billion to the Marie Skłodowska-Curie Actions between 2021 and 2027 (about 7% of the Horizon Europe Programme).

Since the launch of the programme in 1996, over 100,000 researchers had received MSCA grants by March 2017. To mark this milestone, the European Commission selected thirty highly-promising researchers (who achieved the highest evaluation scores in 2016) to showcase the EU's actions dedicated to excellence and worldwide mobility in research.

The eponymous Marie Skłodowska-Curie was a Polish-French physicist and chemist, and the first female Nobel prize winner. The only person to win a Nobel Prize for contributions in two different sciences (physics and chemistry), she was also the first person — and only woman — to have been awarded a Nobel Prize twice.

== Types of funding ==
Fellowships are awarded by the European Commission across scientific disciplines within the framework of Horizon Europe.

MSCA are grouped into the following schemes:

- Doctoral Networks (DN),
- Postdoctoral Fellowships (PF),
- Staff Exchanges (SE),
- Co-funding of regional, national and international programs involving mobility (COFUND),
- MSCA and Citizens.

=== Types of postdoctoral fellowship ===
There are two types of postdoctoral fellowships:

1. European Postdoctoral Fellowships: 1-2 year support for scholars from anywhere doing research within the EU.
2. Global Postdoctoral Fellowships: 2-3 year support for an EU scholar doing 1-2 years of research outside the EU with the third year at "an organisation based in an EU Member State or Horizon Europe Associated Country."

== Sources ==
- Marie Curie Actions (PDF). European Commission. 2012. p. 5. ISBN 978-92-79-24951-8.
