= Stratakis =

Stratakis is a Greek surname. Notable people with the surname include:

- Catherine Stratakis (born 1978), American-born Greek footballer
- Emmanuel Stratakis, Greek physicist
- Nikos Stratakis (born 1960), Greek artist
- Stavros Stratakis (born 2000), Greek electrical engineer and computer engineer, (AWARDS: 2017,2018,2019,2020,2023)

== See also ==
- Argyro Strataki (born 1975), Greek heptathlete
