= Jean-Albert Dinkespiler =

French engineer

Jean-Albert Dinkespiler (1927–2014) was a French engineer and former Chief of the European Joint Research Centre.

== Early life ==
Dinkespiler was born in Paris. He studied Marine and Aeronautical Engineering.

== Career ==
=== Space research ===
Dinkespiler joined the Centre national d'études spatiales (CNES, the French space agency) in 1962, which had been recently formed in December 1961.

Between 1967 and 1974, Dinkespiler was Director of Programmes and Planning at the European Space Research Organisation (ESRO) in Paris, which was merged in 1975 to form the European Space Agency (ESA). In early 1975, the Programmes and Planning department was split into a department for the Communication Satellite Programme (for MAROTS, the maritime navigation satellite, and Orbital Test Satellite, OTS), and a department for Science and Meteosat. Meteosat-1 had been first launched in November 1977, and was controlled by EUMETSAT from 1983 in Darmstadt, Germany. The ground link was to the Fucino Space Centre in Italy, currently run by Telespazio. Darmstadt's European Space Operations Centre (ESOC) had been established by ESRO in September 1967, and currently runs ESA's space missions - its mission control centre.

=== Joint Research Centre ===
Dinkespiler became Director-General of the EEC's Joint Research Centre on 1 April 1982. He was deputy Director between 1974 and 1979. When appointed in 1982, the centre received about £95 million in funding each year.

The Directorate-General is based in Brussels. The previous Director General is Vladimír Šucha and Bernard Magenhann became the acting Director General in May 2024.

== Personal life ==
Dinkespiler died in 2014.

== See also ==
- Directorate-General for Research and Innovation (European Commission)

Government offices
Preceded by	Director General of the Joint Research Centre; April 1982 –	Succeeded by
Preceded by	Director of Programmes and Planning of the European Space Research Organisation; 1967 – 1974	Succeeded by
