= Science and technology in Europe =

Europe's achievements in science and technology have been significant and research and development efforts form an integral part of the European economy. Europe has been the home of some of the most prominent researchers in various scientific disciplines, notably physics, mathematics, chemistry and engineering. Scientific research in Europe is supported by industry, by the European universities and by several scientific institutions. All the raw output of scientific research from Europe consistently ranks among the world's best.

== Historical overview ==
Mathematics flourished in the Greek world from 600 BC to 300 AD. However, the study of mathematics was de-emphasized when the Roman Empire was in power, and became even less important after the fall of Rome.

Medieval Europeans were interested in mathematics for different reasons than modern mathematicians are; namely, they studied mathematics because they thought it was the basis to understand the created order of nature, as explained in Timaeus by Plato and the Book of Wisdom.

During the 16th century, Europe (and by extension their colonies) underwent the Scientific Revolution as natural philosophers began to obtain exact measurements and base their theories on experiments and observations. During this era, mathematics and astronomy were the branches of science that spearheaded the Scientific Revolution, and princely courts were a source of patronage for the sciences. Natural philosophers of this time tried to grasp the laws of nature as a way to understand God's mind, and though Jesuits welcomed the flourishing of science, some Christian authorities instead responded to it by accusing natural philosophers of heresy.

Although the European Union was only founded in 1993, the tradition of scientific research in Europe is much older and can be traced back to the Scientific Revolution. Europe is home to some of the world's oldest universities, such as the University of Bologna, although the oldest European universities were, at the time of their foundation, more centered on philosophy, theology and law than on science.

In the time since World War II, science and technology has played ever more critical roles in the lives of Europeans.

EU enterprises embraced modern digital technology, and in recent years, they have closed an 11-point deficit with the United States in their usage of those technologies. As of 2023, 70% of EU enterprises use innovative digital technology, reducing the gap with the US.

== Institutions ==
=== European Union and Euratom ===
- Directorate-General for Research
- Agencies, independent bodies and joint undertakings of the European Union and the Euratom
  - European Research Council
  - European Institute of Innovation and Technology
  - Joint Research Centre
    - Institute for Reference Materials and Measurements (IRMM)
    - Institute for Transuranium Elements (ITU)
    - Institute for the Protection and the Security of the Citizen (IPSC)
    - Institute for Environment and Sustainability (IES)
    - Institute for Health and Consumer Protection (IHCP)
    - Institute for Energy (IE)
    - Institute for Prospective Technological Studies (IPTS)
  - Joint undertakings
    - of the European Union
      - Bio-based Industries
      - Clean Sky
      - Electronic Components and Systems
      - Fuel Cells and Hydrogen
      - High-Performance Computing
      - Innovative Medicines Initiative
      - Single European Sky Air Traffic Management Research
      - Shift-2-Rail
    - of the Euratom
      - Fusion for Energy
      - Joint European Torus
- European University Institute
- European Research Infrastructure Consortia

=== Other intergovernmental European research organisations ===
- European Organization for Nuclear Research (CERN)
- European Forest Institute
- European Molecular Biology Laboratory (EMBL)
  - European Bioinformatics Institute
- European Southern Observatory (ESO)
- European Space Agency (ESA)
- International Centre for Theoretical Physics
- International Council for the Exploration of the Sea
- International Iberian Nanotechnology Laboratory
- International Institute of Molecular and Cell Biology (IIMCB) in Warsaw
- ITER
- Joint Institute for Nuclear Research

== Scientific fields ==
=== Physics ===
Europe was the birthplace of much of modern physics, including the foundational work of Isaac Newton, Albert Einstein, Max Planck, and Marie Curie. After the Second World War, European physics faced a significant decline relative to the United States, prompting a group of scientists, including French physicist Louis de Broglie, to propose a shared European laboratory for nuclear and particle physics research.

This led to the founding of CERN (European Organization for Nuclear Research) in 1954 near Geneva, with the aim of re-establishing European scientific leadership and fostering international collaboration. CERN went on to become the world's leading particle physics laboratory, contributing to discoveries such as the W and Z bosons, the determination of the number of light neutrino families, and the 2012 discovery of the Higgs boson using the Large Hadron Collider, the world's largest and highest-energy particle accelerator. CERN was also the birthplace of the World Wide Web, developed there in 1989.

=== Chemistry ===
Chemistry is a branch of science that deals with the study of matter, its properties, composition, and the changes it undergoes. It explores the interactions and transformations of atoms and molecules, providing insights into the fundamental principles that govern the physical and chemical world around us.

Chemistry is divided into various sub-disciplines, including organic chemistry, inorganic chemistry, physical chemistry, analytical chemistry, and biochemistry. Organic chemistry focuses on the study of carbon compounds, while inorganic chemistry examines the properties and behavior of inorganic substances. Physical chemistry delves into the principles and theories that explain the behavior of matter and the energy changes associated with chemical reactions. Analytical chemistry involves the identification and quantification of substances and their properties. Biochemistry explores the chemical processes that occur within living organisms.

Chemistry is necessary for understanding the composition and behavior of materials, developing new medicines, designing and optimizing industrial processes, and addressing environmental issues. The discoveries and advancements in chemistry has had its impact across various fields, including medicine, agriculture, energy, materials science, and technology.

=== Mathematics ===
Mathematics flourished in the Greek world from 600 BC to 300 AD, but mathematical philosophy was de-emphasized over practical methods during the rise of the Roman Empire. After the fall of Rome, many ancient mathematical works were lost or destroyed, and the role of mathematics was further reduced by Europe's political fragmentation.

The idea of Hindu-Arabic numerals came to Europe c. 1200 AD, but was not immediately popular due to use of the old Roman numerals. The system of Arabic numerals was popularized by Italian mathematician Leonardo de Pisa (more famously known as Fibonacci), and had finally become popular among merchants in Italy, France, Germany, and Britain for accounting by 1400, and in use by most textbooks by the mid-15th century.

During the first half of the 16th century, Scipione del Ferro and Niccolò Fontana Tartaglia discovered how to solve cubic equations. In 1545, Gerolamo Cardano published them in his book Ars Magna, along with a method to solve quartic equations discovered by Lodovico Ferrari.

Our current notations for addition, subtraction, multiplication, and division, and equations were also invented in Europe. The + and – signs were first used in warehouses, then appeared in print in 1526 in a German math book. The symbols for multiplication and division came later. The equal sign was first used in England in 1557. Mathematicians represented unknown quantities in equations with letters by 1600.

The first systematic treatment of decimal notation, De Thiende (a book by Simon Stevin), was published in 1585.

Though mathematics had a secondary role in the mid-16th century, it became considered the most powerful tool of scientific research by the 18th century, as a general mathematization of civil life took place.

== See also ==
- European Research Area
- Framework Programmes for Research and Technological Development
- Horizon Europe
- Lisbon Strategy
- Science and technology in Africa
- Science and technology in Asia
