= Peter Stephan =

German mechanical engineer and professor

Peter Stephan (born in 1963), is a German mechanical engineer and a professor for Technical Thermodynamics at Technische Universität Darmstadt (TU Darmstadt).

== Life and academic career ==
Peter Stephan obtained his Diplom (equivalent to M.Sc.) from the Technical University of Munich in 1988 and his PhD from the University of Stuttgart in 1992. The doctoral thesis explores the evaporation in heat pipes and is based on research carried out at the Joint Research Centre of the European Commission in Ispra (Italy). He continued his professional career in research and development in the automotive industry at Daimler-Benz and Mercedes-Benz.

Since 1997, Peter Stephan has been full professor for technical thermodynamics as well as head of the institute of the same name at the Department of Mechanical Engineering at TU Darmstadt. His main research focusses on heat transfer, evaporation and condensation, interfacial transport and wetting, and the analysis of complex thermal energy systems.

Throughout his long-standing career at TU Darmstadt, Peter Stephan held various positions in research management and governance, such as speaker of different research clusters and one collaborative research centre as well as Head of Department, and member of academic senate and university assembly. From 2021 to 2022 he served as the university’s Vice-President for Research and Early Careers.

== Awards ==
Peter Stephan obtained the following awards:

- 1995 Sadi Carnot Award for Thermodynamics, International Institute of Refrigeration
- 2002 Prize for Excellence in Heat Transfer Research, Société Française de Thermique
- 2005 Team Achievement Award, European Space Agency
- 2012 Nukiyama Memorial Award, Heat Transfer Society of Japan
- 2018 VDI Medal of Honor, Association of German Engineers
- 2020 Fellow of the American Society of Mechanical Engineers
