= Legalstart =

French online legal services platform

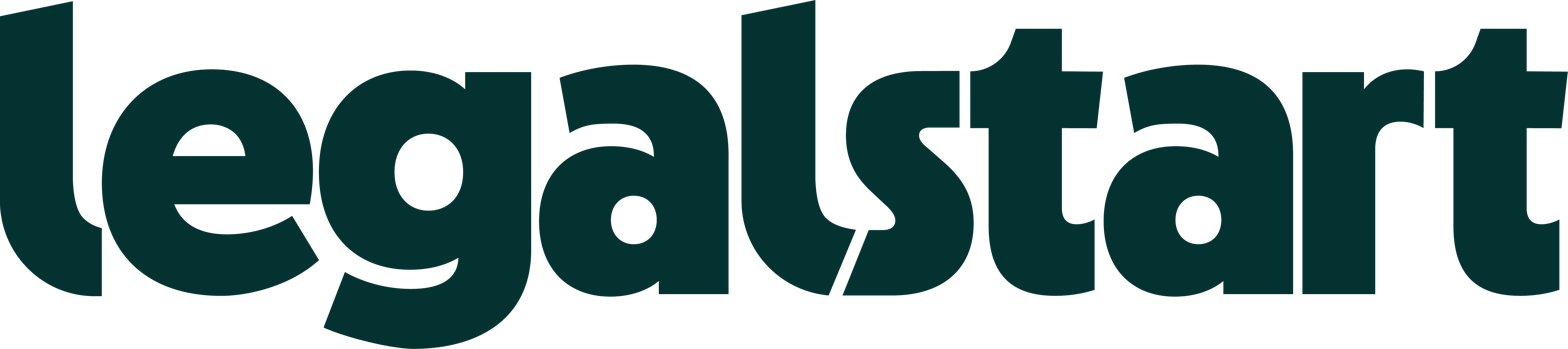
- Company type: Simplified joint-stock company (SAS)
- Founded: October 19, 2012
- Founders: Pierre Aïdan, Timothée Rambaud, and Stéphane Le Viet
- Headquarters: Paris, France
- Key people: Pierre Aïdan, Timothée Rambaud
- Number of employees: 51-200

Legalstart (legally known as Yolaw) is an online legal services platform designed to assist micro, small, and medium-sized enterprises (SMEs) in managing their administrative, legal, and accounting procedures.

== History ==
Yolaw was co-founded in 2012 by Pierre Aïdan (lawyer at the Paris and New York bars), Timothée Rambaud (engineer) and Stéphane Le Viet (entrepreneur). The commercial launch of legalstart.fr occurred in March 2014.

In 2016, Legalstart won BPI France's Digital Innovation Competition.

In April 2018, Legalstart acquired a stake in Legafrik, an African legaltech firm, to promote business creation within the OHADA zone.

In June 2018, Legalstart and Kandbaz, a specialist in business domiciliation, formed a partnership aimed at simplifying business creation in France.

A few months later, in November 2018, Legalstart launched an online accounting platform. In March 2019, Legalstart raised over €15 million from the ISAI fund.

In March 2021, the company extended its activity to streamline company's administrative and legal tasks by partnering with Infogreffe. This collaboration enabled the company to expand its range of services, from drafting company articles of association to entering legal formalities directly on the Infogreffe platform.

In April 2021, Legalstart and around a hundred hypergrowth companies signed the "Climate Act," committing to conducting a full carbon assessment by the end of the year and taking concrete actions to reduce their environmental footprint.

In September 2021, Legalstart completed a Leveraged Buyout (LBO), sponsored by the ISAI fund and financed by Omnes Capital. At the same time, ISAI increased its stake in Legalstart.

In June 2023, the company and Legafrik entered the Moroccan market.

In July 2023, Legalstart launched Zen, a service designed to protect entrepreneurs from administrative scams and oversights. Zen includes a personalized calendar for tracking and complying with administrative obligations, provision of mandatory registers, and facilitation of certain obligatory procedures.

In September 2024, Legalstart launched its payment account for professionals.

In December, Legalstart partnered with Orus, an insurtech company founded in 2021, to simplify access to professional insurance for entrepreneurs.

Legalstart's partners include the NCE network, BNP Paribas, Station F, ADIE, BPI and Finom.

In 2024, Legalstart co-founder Timothée Rambaud won the Prix d’Honneur Mines Paris – PSL.
