= European Research Advisory Board =

EURAB was the European Research Advisory Board from 2001 to 2007. Its successor – since 2008 – is the European Research Area Board (ERAB).

== About ==
It is a high-level, independent, advisory committee created by the European Commission to provide advice on the design and implementation of EU research policy. EURAB is made up of 45 (ERAB: 22) top experts from EU countries and beyond. Its members are nominated in a personal capacity and come from a wide range of academic and industrial backgrounds, as well as representing other societal interests. EURAB focuses its attention on the realisation of the European Research Area and the use of policy instruments such as the Community RTD Framework Programmes. EURAB delivers advice and opinions on specific issues either at the request of the Commission or on its own initiative. The board is free to cooperate with organisations and institutions interested in European research, to create working groups on specific themes and to consult with other experts who could enrich its reflection. Horst Soboll was chair of EURAB until 2007, from 2001 to 2005 it was Helga Nowotny.

== See also ==
- Bureau of European Policy Advisers (BEPA)
- Directorate-General for Research
- Directorate-General of the Joint Research Centre (European Commission)
- European Council of Applied Sciences and Engineering (Euro-CASE)
- European Institute of Technology (EIT)
- European Research Council (ERC)
- Information Society Technologies Advisory Group (ISTAG)
