= Nicolosi (disambiguation) =

Nicolosi is a commune in Italy.

Nicolosi may also refer to:

== Surname ==
- Barbara Nicolosi (born 1964), American screenwriter
- Francesco Nicolosi (born 1954), Italian pianist
- Joseph Nicolosi (1947–2017), American clinical psychologist
- Nicolò Nicolosi (1912–1986), Italian football player and manager
- Roberto Nicolosi (1914–1989), Italian musician
- Salvatore Nicolosi (1922–2014), Italian Catholic Prelate
- Valeria Nicolosi, nanotechnologist
- Rolando Nicolosi (1934–2018), Argentinian musician and composer
- Maurizio Nicolosi (born 1966), Italian actor

== Other uses ==
- Nicolosi Productions, an Italian record label
- Nicolosi globular projection, a map invented by the Iranian Golden Age polymath al-Biruni and reworked by Nicolosi in 1660.
