= Angele Giuliano =

Maltese businesswoman

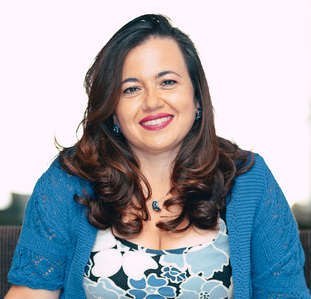
- Born: 30 January 1976 (age 50); Hamrun, Malta
- Education: University of Malta
- Occupation: Businesswoman

Angele Giuliano (born 30 January 1976) is a Maltese businesswoman and president of the Maltese Foundation for Women Entrepreneurs. Giuliano has been CEO and managing director at AcrossLimits since 2001, as well as an expert evaluator for the European Commission and a European Innovation Council (EIC) ambassador. She is also a business angel engaged in mentoring start-ups and entrepreneurs in Malta and internationally.

== Biography ==
Giuliano was born in Hamrun, the youngest of three sisters. After finishing her secondary education, she went on to study business and computing at the University of Malta. She later read for a master's degree in Innovation and Creativity at the Edward de Bono for the Design and Development of Thinking. After graduating Giuliano was invited to become a visiting lecturer at the University of Malta, tutoring students on eCommerce, business and technology.

In 2001, Giuliano founded AcrossLimits Ltd, an SME providing services in the fields of consultancy, research and IT development, and project management. As CEO and managing director of the company, Giuliano has developed eHealth and eLearning applications, consulted for a number of large public and private organisations on business innovation and internationalisation, and contributed to policy documents and white papers for clients including the European Parliament. Additionally, Giuliano has developed and managed a number of research and innovation projects with an array of European partners, and provides professional online development courses under the TrainingMalta brand.

Giuliano has acted as an expert evaluator for the European Directorate-General for Research and Innovation, the Ministry of Education, University and Research (Italy), the Cyprus Research and Innovation Foundation and the Malta Council for Science and Technology. She has also continued to lecture at the University of Malta. Giuliano has published a number of papers on technology, most recently on entry-points into STEM fields for young people, and contributed to books on technology and education.

Besides her position at AcrossLimits, Giuliano is also a business angel at Go Beyond Investing and Rising Tide 1 Female Investment Group. In this role, she evaluates business pitches relating to start-ups and scale-ups for the European market. In 2009, she launched the SME Week in Brussels with the then-Commissioner for Enterprise and Industry, Günter Verheugen.

Giuliano is President of the Foundation for Women Entrepreneurs. In this role she has lobbied for better representation of women in the business world, particularly in Malta and in Europe. She has also acted as an expert and panelist for a number of panels on European women in business, and had strong links with the European Institute for Gender Equality.

Giuliano has long been involved in business mentoring and giving advice to prospective entrepreneurs. She acts to encourage women to take up IT and enter into business, something which she has pursued as an Ambassador for the eSkills Malta Foundation, as a rapporteur in European Commission workshops on women in IT and through interviews in the press.

=== Honours ===
- 1998: Winner of the EuroMed Multimedia Award, heading a team of 15 people.
- 2018: Winner of the Malta Innovation Summit Award for the social enterprise iSmart.
- 2020: Horizon Malta Awards to AcrossLimits for Best Impact on Health, Security or Smart Mobility Award for the project Bio2Excel Centre of Excellence for Computational Biomolecular Research.
- 2020: Best Promotion of STEM Award for AcrossLimits for the project ERA4STEM.
- 2021: National Champion for the European Innovation Council in Malta, along with Professor André Xuereb. She has been a member of the EIC jury for the past three years.
- 2021: EIC Ambassador in recognition of her influence in the European innovation ecosystem.

== Personal life ==
Giuliano lives with her partner Antti Heikkilä and her son in Hamrun, Malta.
