= Urban Culture Lab =

- Established: 2014
- Research type: Interdisciplinary forum for studies in urban culture
- Field of research: Urban culture, Humanities, Urban sociology, Urbanism, Urbanization, Livability
- Director: Henrik Reeh
- Location: Copenhagen, Denmark
- Operating agency: University of Copenhagen
- Website: Urban Culture Lab

Urban Culture Lab is an interdisciplinary forum for studies in urban culture and was established spring 2014. The Lab is based at the Faculty of Humanities, which is a part of the University of Copenhagen. The main focus of Urban Culture Lab is to bring together scholars of urban culture, cities, livability and urbanity. The Lab is headed by associate professor Henrik Reeh.

== Activities ==
Since its formation, Urban Culture Lab has conducted a number of public seminars showcasing current studies in Urban Culture within the Faculty of Humanities. Researchers affiliated with the Lab has also made public appearances as experts within the field of urban culture and livability - examples of such appearances include radio shows and videos.

During Euroscience Open Forum 2014 in Copenhagen (ESOF2014) Urban Culture Lab contributed with a number of panels and sessions focusing on themes such as urbanity and livability. In relation to Copenhagen being named the world's most liveable city by Monocle in 2014 Urban Culture Lab arranged a cross-disciplinary scientific panel at ESOF2014 in order to discuss livability as a concept. The Lab also conducted a project during the conference named Sense of Cycling (Sense of Cycling). The project examined a diversity of bicycling practices and perceptions by inviting a number of participants to conduct fieldwork within the city of Copenhagen. The key findings were presented at a public seminar during ESOF2014.

Urban Culture Lab is also part of the interdisciplinary and international master programme 4Cities. The programme is a UNICA Euromaster with a focus on urban studies and is organised as a collaboration between 6 European universities. Students enrolled in the programme spend a semester in four different cities, and Urban Culture Lab's chairman Henrik Reeh and affiliated researcher and professor Martin Zerlang are responsible for the University of Copenhagen's part in this programme.

== Organisation ==
Urban Culture Lab is run by a steering committee with representatives from eight departments at the Faculty of Humanities and the deanery: Associate Professor Henrik Reeh is the chairman of this committee. The Lab also has a number of affiliated researchers conducting research in a number of different areas related to urban culture.

== See also ==
- University of Copenhagen
- Faculty of Humanities (University of Copenhagen)
