= EURYI =

Research award aimed at young scientists

The European Young Investigator (EURYI) Awards scheme was a prestigious research award designed to attract outstanding young scientists in all research fields to the European research landscape. It was set up by the European Heads of Research Councils (EuroHORCs) and the European Science Foundation together as a grant scheme for researchers from any country in the world to create their own research teams at research institutions in any country in Europe participating in the scheme. Awards were worth up to 1.25 Million Euros, to be spent over a period of five years. It was meant to attract the strongest scientists, irrespective of age and gender. It had a two-stage selection process. In a first step, the applications were assessed by the participating organisation from the proposed host country. The second selection step was carried out by the European Science Foundation, involving interviews in front of broadly-based international panels, and resulted in the final selection of awardees. The first 25 prizes were awarded on 26 August 2004 as the EURYI Awards 2005 during the EuroScience Open Forum (ESOF) in Stockholm by the then president of the EuroHORCs, Professor Ernst-Ludwig Winnacker.

The scheme was born out of the wish to allow the best researchers to build careers in Europe. The co-initiating institution EuroHORCS, founded in 1992 and dissolved in 2011 and succeeded by Science Europe, was an association of 18 research organisations from 15 European countries, all of which being members of the European Union at the time except Switzerland and Turkey. The EURYI Award was the blueprint for the much larger ERC Grant scheme, initiated in 2007 within the Seventh Framework Programme, with Professor Ernst-Ludwig Winnacker, the initiator of the EURYI Award, being the ERC's first Secretary General. The EURYI Award 2007 was the last EURYI award granted, being replaced by the ERC scheme.
