= Louise Moody =

Louise Moody is Professor of Health Design and Human Factors and is the Director of the Centre for Arts, Memory and Communities, Coventry University.

== Education ==
Moody was awarded her PhD from the School of Electronic, Electrical and Computer Engineering at the University of Birmingham in 2002. Her doctoral thesis was entitled, Simulated Environments and Data Collection. Techniques for the Examination of Surgical Performance. She received a BSc in Psychology and Sports Science, also at the University of Birmingham.

== Research and career ==
Moody's research is multidisciplinary, focusing on improving wellbeing and health through the design and development of systems, services and new products, ensuring their functionality and desireability to end-users and stakeholders. Her projects have been supported by external funders such as Innovate UK, NIHR, MRC, Horizon Europe, and industrial and charity-based groups. Moody's research demonstrated that wearing a well-fitting, well-made uniform positively impacted the happiness and confidence of employees, particularly women, and she led a research project that supported research to develop a clothing range for young women with type 1 diabetes. She is the Human Factors theme lead for Devices for Dignity (D4D) Medtech Cooperative, funded by the National Institute for Health Research (NIHR).

== Bibliography ==
- 'Exploring the relationship between uniform and perceived employee happiness and productivity', Journal of Fashion Marketing and Management, 27, 2 (2023) 311–334
- 'Augmented Reality and Functional Skills Acquisition Among Individuals With Special Needs: A Meta-Analysis of Group Design Studies', R. S. Baragash, H. Al-Samarraie, L. Moody, & F. Zaqout, Journal of Special Education Technology, 37, 1 (2022) 74–81
- 'Telemedicine in Middle Eastern countries: Progress, barriers, and policy recommendations', International Journal of Medical Informatics, H. Al-Samarraie, S. Ghazal, A. Ibrahim Alzahrani, & L. Moody (2020)
