= European Research Executive Agency =

Executive agency of the European Union

- Abbreviation: REA
- Formation: 14 December 2007; 18 years ago
- Type: Executive agency of the European Commission
- Headquarters: Brussels, Belgium
- Director: Stephen Collins
- Parent organization: European Commission
- Website: rea.ec.europa.eu

The European Research Executive Agency (REA; formerly the Research Executive Agency) is an executive agency of the European Commission. Established in 2007, it manages parts of the European Union's research and innovation programmes, including Horizon Europe, Horizon 2020 and the Research Fund for Coal and Steel, and provides administrative support for EU-funded research projects.

== History ==
The agency was established by the European Commission on 14 December 2007 to implement parts of the Seventh Framework Programme. Its mandate was extended in 2013 to manage significant parts of Horizon 2020, the EU's framework programme for research and innovation for 2014–2020.

In 2021, the Commission renewed the agency's mandate for the 2021–2027 financial period through Implementing Decision (EU) 2021/173, under which the REA became one of six executive agencies responsible for implementing programmes funded under the EU budget.

== Responsibilities ==
Since 2021, the REA has managed parts of several European Union programmes, including:

- Horizon Europe, particularly:
  - Marie Skłodowska-Curie Actions
  - Research infrastructures
  - Cluster 2: Culture, Creativity and Inclusive Society
  - Cluster 3: Civil Security for Society
  - Cluster 6: Food, Bioeconomy, Natural Resources, Agriculture and Environment
  - Widening participation and spreading excellence
  - Reforming and enhancing the European research and innovation system
- Horizon 2020
- Promotion of agricultural products
- Research Fund for Coal and Steel

The agency also manages the Commission's "Research Enquiry Service", coordinates the evaluation of research proposals by independent experts, provides administrative support to beneficiaries of EU funding programmes, and carries out legal and financial validation of grants and procurement procedures.

== Governance ==
The REA is an executive agency of the European Commission and operates under the supervision of the Commission. It is headed by a director and overseen by a steering committee composed of representatives of the Commission departments responsible for the programmes managed by the agency.

== Budget ==
For the 2021–2027 programming period, the REA manages approximately €22.7 billion in EU funding. During the Horizon 2020 programme (2014–2020), it managed around €17 billion, compared with €6.4 billion under the Seventh Framework Programme (2007–2013).
