= Valeria Nicolosi =

Italian nanotechnologist

Valeria Nicolosi is the Professor of Nanomaterials and Advanced Microscopy in the School of Chemistry in Trinity College Dublin. She is a nanotechnologist who specializes in low-dimensional nano-structures and high-end electron microscopy.

== Career ==
She received her BSc in Chemistry from the University of Catania in 2001 and a PhD in Physics in 2006 from Trinity College Dublin. In 2017, Trinity College Dublin selected her as a Professorial Fellow. Her research has been funded with over 12 million euros since 2012, and is currently associated with Ireland's Advanced Materials and BioEngineering Research (AMBER) science foundation. In addition to being a principal investigator with AMBER, she is Trinity College Dublin's Chair of Nanomaterials and Advanced Microscopy. In 2019 she was admitted as a member of the Royal Irish Academy.

She has previously worked at the University of Oxford where she held a Royal Academy of Engineering/EPSRC Fellowship, and was awarded a European Research Council starting grant to expand her work.

Nicolosi’s research incorporates synthesis, exfoliation and characterization of 2D materials for various applications, particularly energy storage. She is particularly active in the characterization of materials using advanced electron microscopy techniques, such as aberration-corrected TEM, STEM, EELS and EDX. She has published almost 200 papers which have been cited 43,000 times, leading to a h-index of 69.

Nicolosi acted as an Ambassador for the European Innovation Council.
