= Ernst-Ludwig Winnacker =

German geneticist, biochemist and research manager

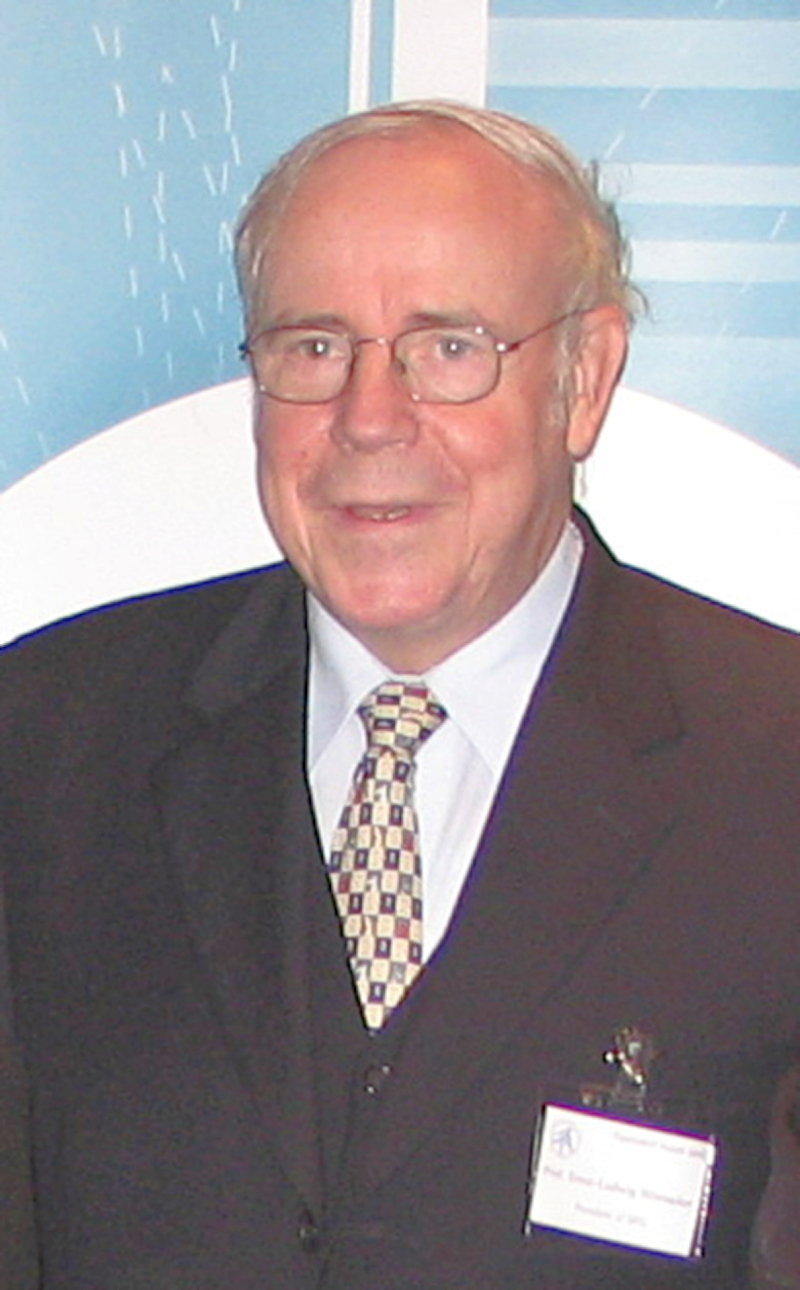
Winnacker in 2005

Ernst-Ludwig Winnacker (born 26 July 1941 in Frankfurt) is a German geneticist, biochemist and research manager. His main fields of research are virus/cell interaction, the mechanisms of gene expression in higher cells and prion diseases. He was President of the German Research Foundation and Secretary General of the European Research Council and is Secretary General of the Human Frontier Science Program Organization.

== Life and work ==
Ernst-Ludwig Winnacker is the son of the German chemist and former CEO of the Hoechst AG Karl Winnacker.

He studied chemistry at ETH Zurich where he obtained his Ph.D. in 1968. Winnacker took part in an effort to chemically synthesize the Vitamin B12. From 1968 to 1972 he took a postdoctoral research position at the University of California, Berkeley, to work with Horace Barker, who discovered the active form of vitamin B12. Winnacker set out to isolate enzymes involved in B12 synthesis. While at the Karolinska Institute in Stockholm, Sweden he became intrigued by the use of recombinant DNA and associated techniques to synthesize and manipulate DNA. In 1972, he became assistant and then DFG Visiting professor at the Institute for Genetics, University of Cologne. In 1977, he was appointed associate professor at the Institute of Biochemistry at LMU Munich where he was made full professor in 1980. From 1984 to 1997, he was Director of the Laboratory of Molecular Biology at the Gene Center Munich of LMU Munich.

In 1998, he was elected President of the German Research Foundation (DFG), a position he held until the end of 2006. From 2003 to 2004, he was Chairman of the European Heads of Research Councils (EUROHORCs) which introduced the EURYI Award and, from 2000 to 2004, Member of the European Group on Life Science (established by European Commissioner for Research Philippe Busquin). From 2007 to 2009, he served as the first Secretary General of the European Research Council (ERC). In 2009, he became as successor of the Nobel Prize winner Torsten Wiesel Secretary General of the Human Frontier Science Program Organization.

== Honours and distinctions ==
- 1992 Bavarian Order of Merit
- 1994 Arthur Burckhardt Prize
- 1996 Officer's Cross of the Order of Merit of the Federal Republic of Germany
- 1999 Honorary doctorate of the University of Veterinary Medicine Vienna, Austria
- 1999 Bavarian Maximilian Order for Science and Art
- 1999 Member of the Inventors gallery of the German Patent and Trade Mark Office
- 1999 Zimmermann Prize for Cancer Research
- 2006 Commander's Cross of the Order of Merit of the Federal Republic of Germany
- 2006 Chevalier de la Legion d’Honneur
- 2007 Commanders's Cross of the Order of Merit of the Republic of Poland
- 2009 International Science and Technology Cooperation Award of the People's Republic of China
- 2009 Order of the Rising Sun, Gold and Silver Star of Japan
- 2010 Grand Cross with Star (Knight Commander's Cross) of the Order of Merit of the Federal Republic of Germany
- 2011 Robert Koch Gold Medal

== Positions in scientific societies and boards ==
- 1984–1987 Expert Member of the Enquete Commission of the German Parliament
- Since 1988 Member of the Scientific-Technical Advisory Council of the Bavarian State Government
- Since 1988 Member of the Academy of Natural Scientists Leopoldina
- Since 1989 Member of the Academia Europaea
- Since 1989 Member of the International Science Committee of the National Academy of Science in Beijing, China
- Since 1993 Member of the North Rhine-Westphalia Academy for Sciences and Arts
- Since 1994 External Vice President of the Academy of Natural Scientists Leopoldina in Halle
- Since 1997 Member of the Göttingen Academy of Sciences
- Since 1998 Member of the Berlin-Brandenburg Academy of Sciences and Humanities
- Member of the Institute of Medicine - National Academy of Sciences, Washington
- 2000–2004 Member of the European Life Science Group of EU Commissioner Philipe Busquin
- 2000–2003 Member of the German National Ethics Board

== Literature ==
- Winnacker, Ernst L. (1987), From genes to clones : introduction to gene technology [Gene und Klone] (in German), Horst Ibelgaufts (trans.), Weinheim, New York: VCH, ISBN 0-89573-614-4
- M Famulok; Ernst L Winnacker; Chi-Huey Wong (1999). Combinatorial chemistry in biology. Current Topics in Microbiology and Immunology, 243. Berlin: Springer. p. 189. ISBN 3-540-65704-5.
- Gesellschaft für Biologische Chemie. Colloquium (39th : 1988 : Mosbach, Baden-Wurttemberg, Germany) (1988). E.-L. Winnacker and R. Huber (ed.). Protein structure and protein engineering. Berlin, New York: Springer. p. 131. ISBN 3-540-50394-3.
- Workshop Conference Hoechst (9th : 1980 : Ising, Germany); Winnacker, Ernst L.; Schoene, Hans-H. (1982). Genes and tumor gene. New York: Raven Press. ISBN 978-0-89004-678-4.
