= Roxanne Varza =

Iranian-American company executive (born 1985)

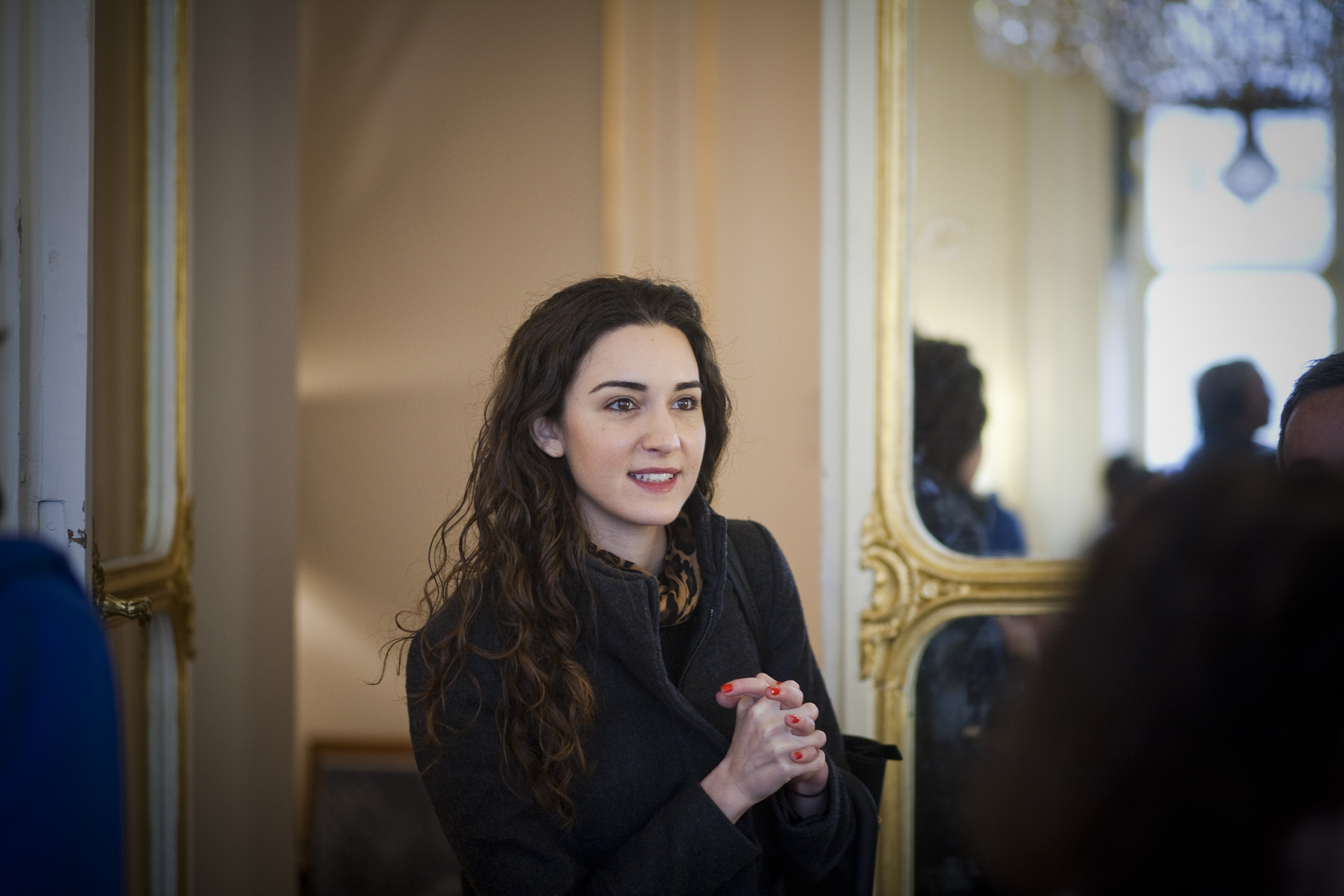
- Born: February 1985 (age 41); Palo Alto, California, US
- Education: University of California at Los Angeles, Bachelors in French/Francophone Studies, 2006 Sciences Po, Masters in International Affairs, 2010 London School of Economics, Masters in International Economics and Politics, 2011
- Occupation: Director of Station F startup campus
- Years active: 2015–present
- Known for: Startups
- Notable work: Led development of Station F
- Spouse: Ning Li
- Children: 1

Roxanne Varza attends TechCrunch Q&A in London, 2015

Roxanne Varza (Persian: رکسانا ورزا; born February 1985) is Director of Station F, a startup campus, the world's biggest facility of its kind, based in Paris, France where she is recognized as one of the most influential figures in the French startup ecosystem. The French media have called Varza the "young empress of startups", the "queen of tech" and "the new pope of high-tech and startups in France." An American-born French with Iranian origins, who grew up in Silicon Valley, Varza was formerly a journalist and startup ambassador before being personally selected by Free founder Xavier Niel to spearhead the development of Station F.

== Personal life ==
Varza was born in February 1985 in Palo Alto, California, in a Zoroastrian family. Her parents emigrated from Iran in 1979 during the Islamic Revolution. Varza obtained a bachelor's degree in French literature from the University of California, Los Angeles (UCLA), after an exchange year in Bordeaux. She enjoyed reading great French authors and philosophers such as the playwriter Molière, poet Baudelaire, philosophers Voltaire, Rousseau and humanist Rabelais. At UCLA, her professors include Alain Mabanckou.

In 2007, she joined Business France, then known as the French International Investment Agency. She advised Silicon Valley companies wishing to set up in France. Later, Varza decided to move to France for further studies. From 2009 to 2011, she pursued a dual degree between Sciences Po Paris and the London School of Economics, obtaining a master's degree in International Business and a degree in International Economic Policy.

Varza is married to Ning Li, who co-founded the furniture company Made.com. They have a daughter.

== Career ==
Varza was previously the head of French Microsoft start-up activities, including Bizspark and Microsoft Ventures and currently serves as Director of Station F, a large startup incubator facility in the 13th arrondissement of Paris. Prior to working with Microsoft, she was part of multiple European start-up companies and was the editor for TechCrunch France, which she received a job offer from after writing the blog TechBaguette. Her activities also include advising Silicon Valley corporations about operating in France. She co-founded Girls in Tech Paris, Girls in Tech London, and was the founder of the website Tech.eu. Girls In Tech organizes training courses in computer code writing for women.

In April 2013, Business Insider ranked Roxanne Varza among the 30 most influential women under 30 in the technology sector. She is currently an Ambassador for the European Innovation Council for the years 2021-2027.

In January 2017, she received French nationality.
