= Helga Nowotny =

Austrian sociologist

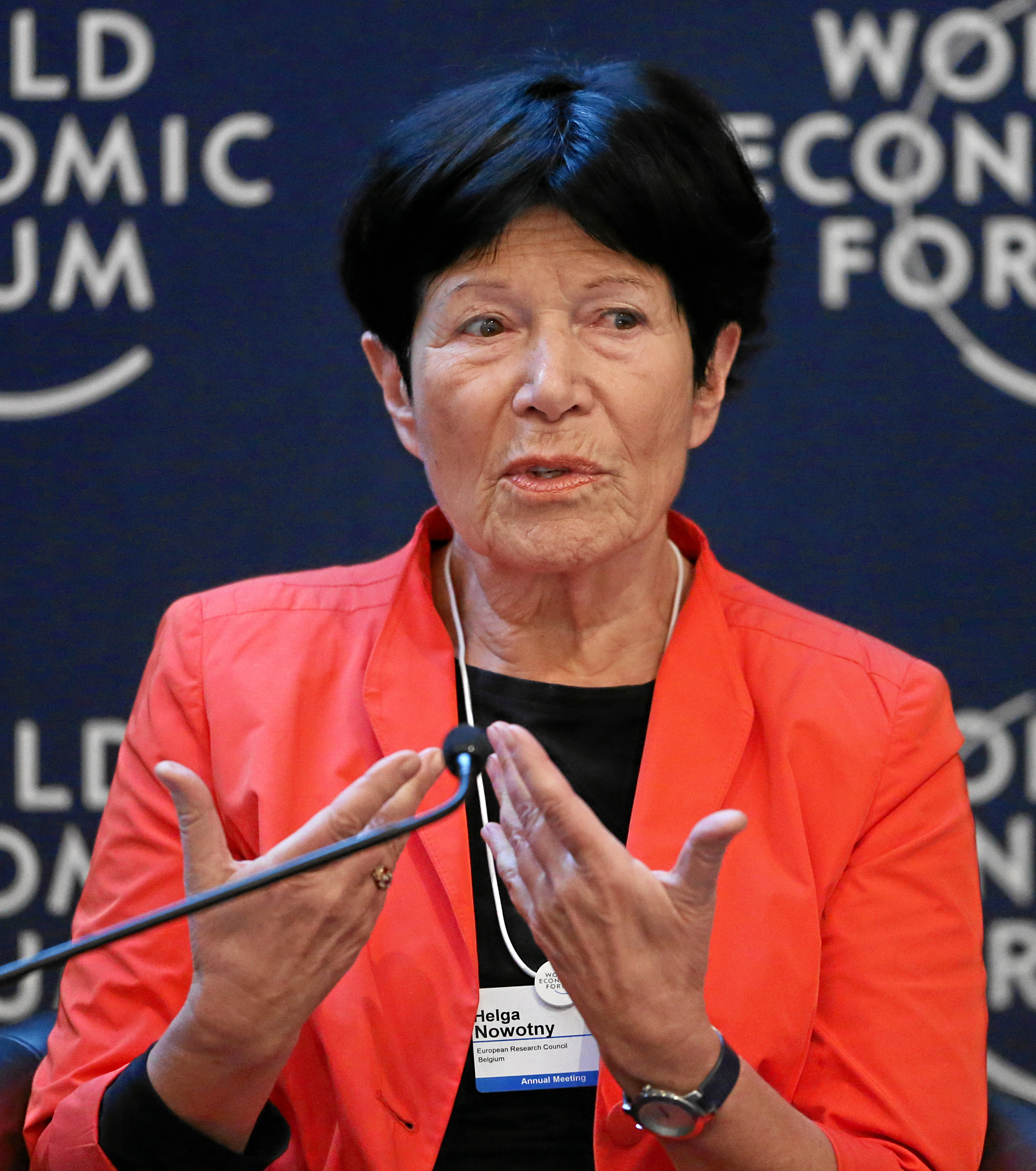
- Nowotny at the World Economic Forum Annual Meeting in 2013
- Born: 9 August 1937 (age 89); Vienna, Austria
- Occupation: Professor at ETH Zurich
- Title: Professor emeritus
- Board member of: European Research Advisory Board of the European Commission (Chair, 2001–2006) Governing Board of the University of Göttingen (Vice-Chair); ERC Scientific Council (President, 2010-2013); Scientific Advisory Board of the University of Vienna (Chair, current) Governing Board of the Science Center in Berlin (current)

Academic background
- Education: University of Vienna
- Alma mater: Columbia University

Academic work
- Discipline: Law, Sociology
- Sub-discipline: Social studies of science, science and society and social time
- Institutions: Vienna Science and Technology Fund; King’s College; Bielefeld University; Wissenschaftszentrum Berlin; School for Advanced Studies in the Social Sciences

Helga Nowotny (born 9 August 1937) is professor emeritus of Social Studies of Science, ETH Zurich. She has held numerous leadership roles on Academic boards and public policy councils, and she has authored many publications in the social studies of science and technology.

== Early life ==
Nowotny grew up in Vienna, Austria during World War II. In interviews, she has recalled first wanting to become a scientist at the age of 8, when she was sent to Vorarlberg, the westernmost province of Austria, and quickly learned the local dialect.

Nowotny received her doctorate of jurisprudence at the University of Vienna in 1959. After completing her degree, she faced opposition to her application for an assistant professorship in the Department of Criminology there on the basis of her being a woman. She agreed with the hiring professor that if a more capable man applied for the position, he could have the job. In the end, she was hired to the position. It was there that she became interested in the sociology of science. In 1965, she moved to New York City with her husband, where she enrolled in a sociology doctoral program. There, she met Paul Lazarsfeld and Robert K. Merton, who mentored her throughout her education.

In 1969, Nowotny earned her Ph.D. in sociology at Columbia University, New York, where she completed her thesis on macrosociology and its methodology. She returned to Vienna to work as an associate professor at the Institute for Advanced Studies.

== Research and publications ==
Nowotny's work in the 1970s and 1980s includes topics such as scientific controversies and technological risks, social time, coping with uncertainty, self-organization in science and gender relations in science, resulting in major monographs, co-edited and edited books and numerous articles. In 1989, she published the book Eigenzeit (English title: Time: The Modern and Postmodern Experience), which has since been translated into several languages.

Between 1992 and 1995 Helga Nowotny has been President of the International Society for the Study of Time. From the 1990s onwards she focused her research activities on new topics in social studies of science and technology. She conducted an empirical study on the discovery of high-superconductivity research and its impact on research policy (with Ulrike Felt) and increasingly on the changing relationship between science and society.

In 1994 Nowotny helped coin the term “Mode 2” for a new mode of applied research focused on solving specific problems. By contrast, “Mode 1” is basic research done within disciplines, initiated by the interest of the investigator, not from external demand.

== Research policy ==
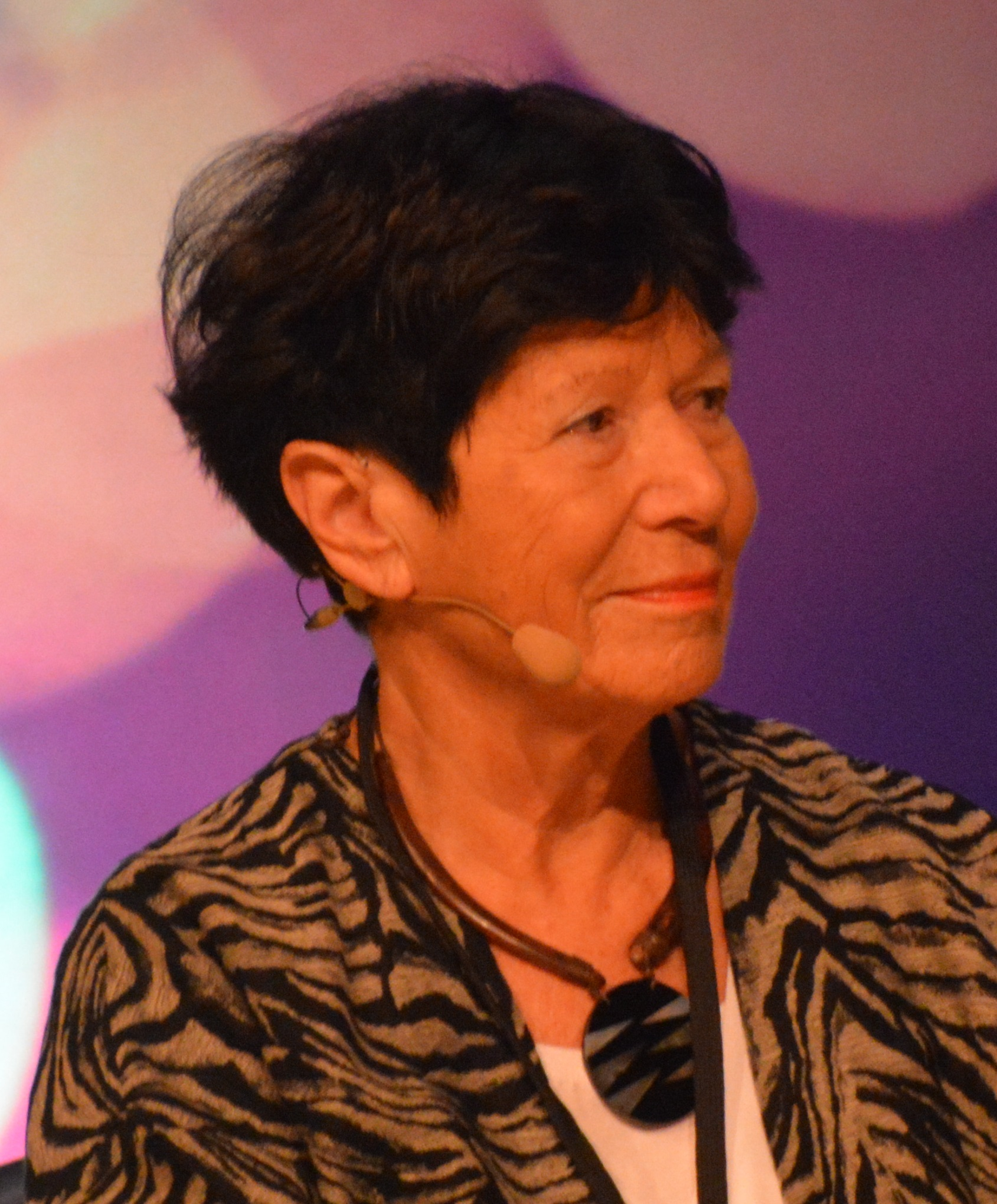
Nowotny at a public speaking event in December 2015.

Next to her teaching and research activities, carried out at several universities and research institutions in Europe, Nowotny had always been intensely engaged in research policy. From 1985 to 1992 she was Chair of the Standing Committee for the Social Sciences of the European Science Foundation. She has been chair and member of the scientific advisory boards of numerous research institutions and policy-related committees throughout Europe. From 2001 until early 2006 she was Chair of EURAB, the European Research Advisory Board of the European Commission.

Nowotny is one of the founding members of the European Research Council, which has been established to fund frontier research at EU level based on the sole criteria of scientific excellence and pan-European competition. There she served as the Vice President and in February 2010, Nowotny was unanimously elected to the position of President of the European Research Council after the resignation of the founding president, Fotis Kafatos. As president of the ERC, she promoted increases in research funding across Europe, and advised new EU member states to increase funding support for their own research programs to prevent a "brain drain". She held the position until December 2013.

In 2014, Nowotny was appointed chair of the ERA Council Forum Austria, which advises the Austrian Ministry of Science and Research at the interface of European and national research policy.

Currently, Nowotny is Chair of the International Advisory Board of the University of Vienna. In 2020, she was appointed by European Commissioner for Innovation, Research, Culture, Education and Youth Mariya Gabriel to chair an independent search committee for the next president of the ERC.

== Professional positions ==
In 1981-1982 and 2003-2004 Nowotny was a Fellow at the Wissenschaftskolleg zu Berlin and from 1992 to 1999 she was also a Permanent Fellow at Collegium Budapest/Institute of Advanced Study. Before moving to ETH Zurich, she was Professor and Head of the newly founded Institute for Theory and Social Studies of Science of the University of Vienna.

From 1998, Nowotny was Director of the Collegium Helveticum at ETH Zurich. She was also the founding director of the ETH-based post-graduate fellowship programme “Society in science: the Branco Weiss Fellowship” until 2004, when she returned to her native Vienna. From 2008 to 2014, Nowotny was a member of the Holberg Committee, which awards the Holberg Prize to scholars who have made outstanding contributions to research in the arts and humanities, social sciences, law or theology.

Nowotny has held teaching and research positions at the Institute of Advanced Study in Vienna, King's College, Cambridge, UK, Bielefeld University, the Wissenschaftszentrum Berlin and the École des Hautes Études en Sciences Sociales in Paris. Nowotny is vice president of the council for the Lindau Nobel Laureate Meetings. She is a member of the Academic Senate at the Swedish Collegium for Advanced Study in Uppsala, Sweden.

== Awards and prizes ==
Nowotny has been a Member of Academia Europaea and Foreign Member of the Royal Swedish Academy of Sciences since 2006. Among other honours she has been awarded the J.D. Bernal Prize for her lifelong achievements in social studies of science. In October 2015, she received an honorary doctorate at the University of Bergen. She has also received an honorary doctorate from the Weizmann Institute of Science and the University of Twente. In July 2013, Nowotny was awarded an Honorary Doctorate by Lancaster University, UK.

In September 2017, she was awarded the President's Medal of the British Academy "for her contribution to the founding and shaping of the European Research Council, and positively influencing the shape of research funding and research policy in the UK and Europe".

== Selected bibliography ==
=== Books ===
- Nowotny, Helga; Mendelsohn, Everett (1984). Nineteen eighty-four: science between utopia and dystopia. Dordrecht Boston Hingham, Massachusetts: D. Reidel Publishg Co. ISBN 9789027717214.
- Nowotny, Helga; et al. (1994). The new production of knowledge: the dynamics of science and research in contemporary societies. London Thousand Oaks, California: SAGE Publications. ISBN 9780803977945.
- Nowotny, Helga; Taschwer, Klaus (1996). The sociology of the sciences. Cheltenham, UK Brookfield, Vermont, US: E. Elgar. ISBN 9781852789114. Pdf of book contents.
- Nowotny, Helga; Scott, Peter; Gibbons, Michael (2001). Re-thinking science: knowledge and the public in an age of uncertainty. Cambridge, UK: Polity. ISBN 9780745626086.
- Nowotny, Helga (2005). The public nature of science under assault politics, markets, science and the law. Berlin New York: Springer. ISBN 9783540257912.
- Nowotny, Helga (2006). Cultures of technology and the quest for innovation. New York, New York: Berghahn Books. ISBN 9781845451172. Conference details: Cultures of technology and the quest for innovation, Kulturwissenschaftliches Institut (KWI) in Essen, Germany, April 2003.
- Nowotny, Helga (2008). Insatiable curiosity: innovation in a fragile future. Cambridge, Massachusetts: MIT Press. ISBN 9781435654976.
- Nowotny, Helga; Testa, Giuseppe (2010). Naked genes: reinventing the human in the molecular age. Cambridge, Massachusetts: MIT Press. ISBN 9780262014939.

=== Journal articles and book chapters ===
- Nowotny, Helga (September 1992). "Time and social theory: towards a social theory of time". Time & Society. 1 (3): 421–454. doi:10.1177/0961463X92001003006. S2CID 145062035.
- Nowotny, Helga (October 1993). "Socially distributed knowledge: five spaces for science to meet the public". Public Understanding of Science. 2 (4): 307–319. doi:10.1088/0963-6625/2/4/002. S2CID 143351946.
- Nowotny, Helga (May 1999). "The place of people in our knowledge". European Review. 7 (2): 247–262. doi:10.1017/S1062798700004026. S2CID 143672549.
- Nowotny, Helga (February 2000). "Transgressive competence: the narrative of expertise". European Journal of Social Theory. 3 (1): 5–21. doi:10.1177/136843100003001001. S2CID 17147844.
- Nowotny, Helga (June 2003). "Democratising expertise and socially robust knowledge". Science and Public Policy. 30 (3): 151–156. Bibcode:2003SciPP..30..151N. doi:10.3152/147154303781780461. hdl:20.500.11850/423040.
- Nowotny, Helga (October 2005). "The increase of complexity and its reduction: emergent interfaces between the natural sciences, humanities and social sciences". Theory, Culture & Society. 22 (5): 15–31. doi:10.1177/0263276405057189. S2CID 144901646.
- Nowotny, Helga (2022), "The Quest for Innovation and Cultures of Technology", in Hannes Obermair and Harald Pechlaner (ed.), Eurac Research: Inventing Science in a Region, Bozen-Bolzano: Eurac Research, pp. 195–207, doi:10.57749/a924-n835, ISBN 978-88-6839-628-2.
