= EuroScience =

Pan-European grassroots organisation

EuroScience was founded in 1997 for the support and promotion of science and technology in Europe. EuroScience is a membership-based non-profit association to foster open debate about science and create networks in research and innovation. Its members include anyone interested in European research, whether professional scientists, policy-makers, industries or members of the public.

The EuroScience headquarters are located in Strasbourg. Michael Matlosz is currently the President of EuroScience and Matthias Girod its Secretary General.

The main issues EuroScience wants to address are:

- Sustainable Academic Careers
- Mental health, Public Engagement
- True Science Dialogue
- Inclusive Science
- Freedom and Societal Responsibility of Science
- Truly Open Science

== Aims and Activities ==
=== Aims ===
EuroScience:

- provides an open forum for debate on science and technology and research policies in Europe
- strengthens the dialogue between science and society
- improves the research culture in Europe
- promotes responsible and sustainable innovation.

=== Activities ===
- ESOF - The EuroScience Open Forum is the flagship event of EuroScience.
- ESPF - The EuroScience Policy Forum has been launched for the first time in 2021 and will take place for the second time in 2023.
- Awarding the title of European City of Science.
- The European Young Researchers Award.
- The EuroScientist - is a participative webzine about science and innovation.
- Other past European projects: NewHoRRIzzon, RRI Tools etc.

== EuroScience Open Forum ==
EuroScience organises the EuroScience Open Forum which brings together stakeholders involved in European science. The ESOF is held every two years and is hosted by a European city awarded the title European City of Science.

ESOF gives the opportunity to lead scientists, researchers, business people and entrepreneurs, innovators, policymakers and science communicators from all over Europe to discuss new discoveries and debate the direction that research is taking in all sciences, including social sciences and humanities.

ESOF comprises

- A main Scientific Programme: a programme with opportunities to debate with speakers (Scientific sessions, plenary sessions, Key Notes, workshops, Field trips, poster presentations etc.
- An Exhibition
- Networking and other events: events and networking opportunities (Welcome Reception, delegate party etc.)
- The European Science in the City Festival: which offers the general public to discover more about science but also gives the opportunity to meet scientists and science professionals.

== See also ==
- Science and technology in Europe
- Directorate-General for Research
- European Science Foundation
- European Research Area (ERA)
- Eurodoc
- Academia Europæa
- Lisbon Strategy

== Sources ==
- EuroScience Open Forum 2006, Biotechnol J. 2006 Sep;1(9):890-1
- A new opportunity for science in Europe, Nature 1996;384:108
- Europas Wissenschaftler gründen ihre Lobby, die Euroscience, Die Zeit, Nr 13, 21 March 1997
- New Euroscience group, Research Europe, 20 nov. 1997, p. 6
