= Big Mamma (company) =

French restaurant brand specializing in Italian cuisine

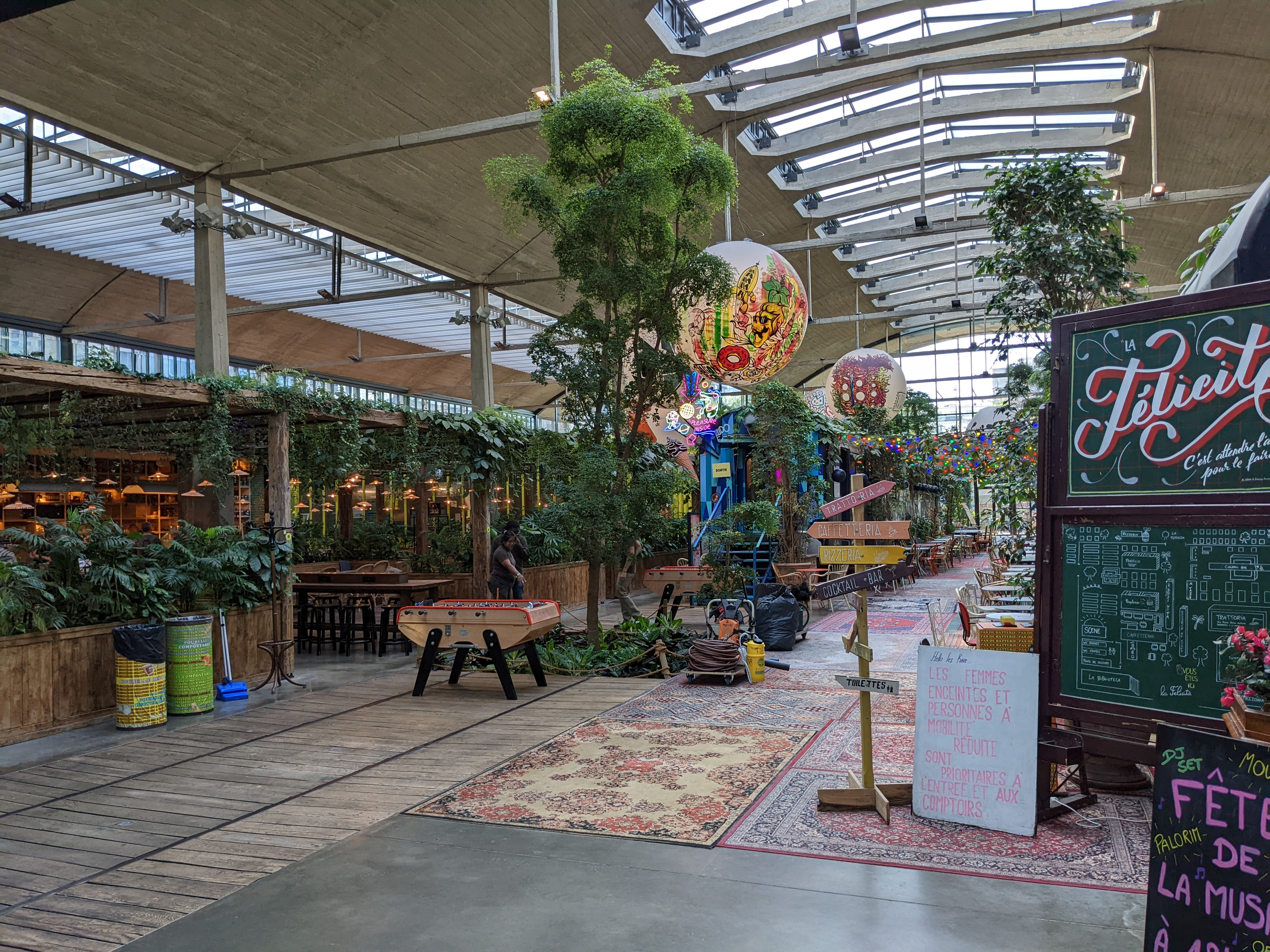
- La Felicità
- Company type: Société par actions simplifiée
- Industry: Restaurants
- Founded: 2015; 11 years ago
- Founders: Victor Lugger and Tigrane Seydoux
- Headquarters: Paris, France
- Number of locations: ▲34 restaurants (2025)
- Area served: Europe
- Key people: Victor Lugger and Tigrane Seydoux
- Number of employees: (2000)
- Website: bigmammagroup.com

Big Mamma is a French restaurant group specializing in Italian cuisine and founded in 2015 in Paris by entrepreneurs Victor Lugger and Tigrane Seydoux. In 2024, the group has 29 restaurants in France, United Kingdom, Spain and Monaco.

== History ==
The Big Mamma Group company was created in 2015 by entrepreneurs Victor Lugger and Tigrane Seydoux, who met at HEC Paris, with the help of private investors including Xavier Niel and Stéphane Courbit.

The concept saw the opening of seven restaurants in three years. Due to the lack of a reservation system, long queues of customers formed outside the restaurants and thus distinguished them from other restaurant brands.

In 2018, the group moved to the Station F campus created by Niel: its restaurant La Felicità occupies 4,500 m^{2} of space for 7 different catering points, including a cafeteria open 24/7. At the time, the group sold nearly 8,000 meals per day, compared to 4,000 the year before.

In February 2019, the group exported abroad, with the opening of two restaurants in London. At that time, he employed around 1,000 employees in Paris, and the London restaurant used 180 different producers, with some products being shipped from Italy to London in less than 36 hours.

In 2022, the group had 2,000 employees. In 2023, the English investment fund McWin bought Big Mamma, becoming its majority shareholder; Lugger and Seydoux remained minority shareholders and co-CEOs, while the historical investors (including Niel and Courbit) took the opportunity to sell all their shares to McWin.

== Concept ==
Big Mamma restaurants base their sales concept on highlighting the artisanal origin of their Italian suppliers. The group asks restaurant staff to speak Italian to customers.

In the French restaurant landscape, the company's success has aroused hostility; some compare it to a "soulless" marketing initiative.

== Locations ==
By the end of 2023, the group will manage 23 restaurants in Europe (France, Belgium, Germany, Spain, Monaco and the United Kingdom), including La Felicità in Paris.

== Distinction ==
In November 2017, the two founders Victor Lugger and Tigrane Seydoux received the "entrepreneurs of the year" award from the Gault Millau gastronomic guide.
