= Jerzy Langer =

Polish physicist

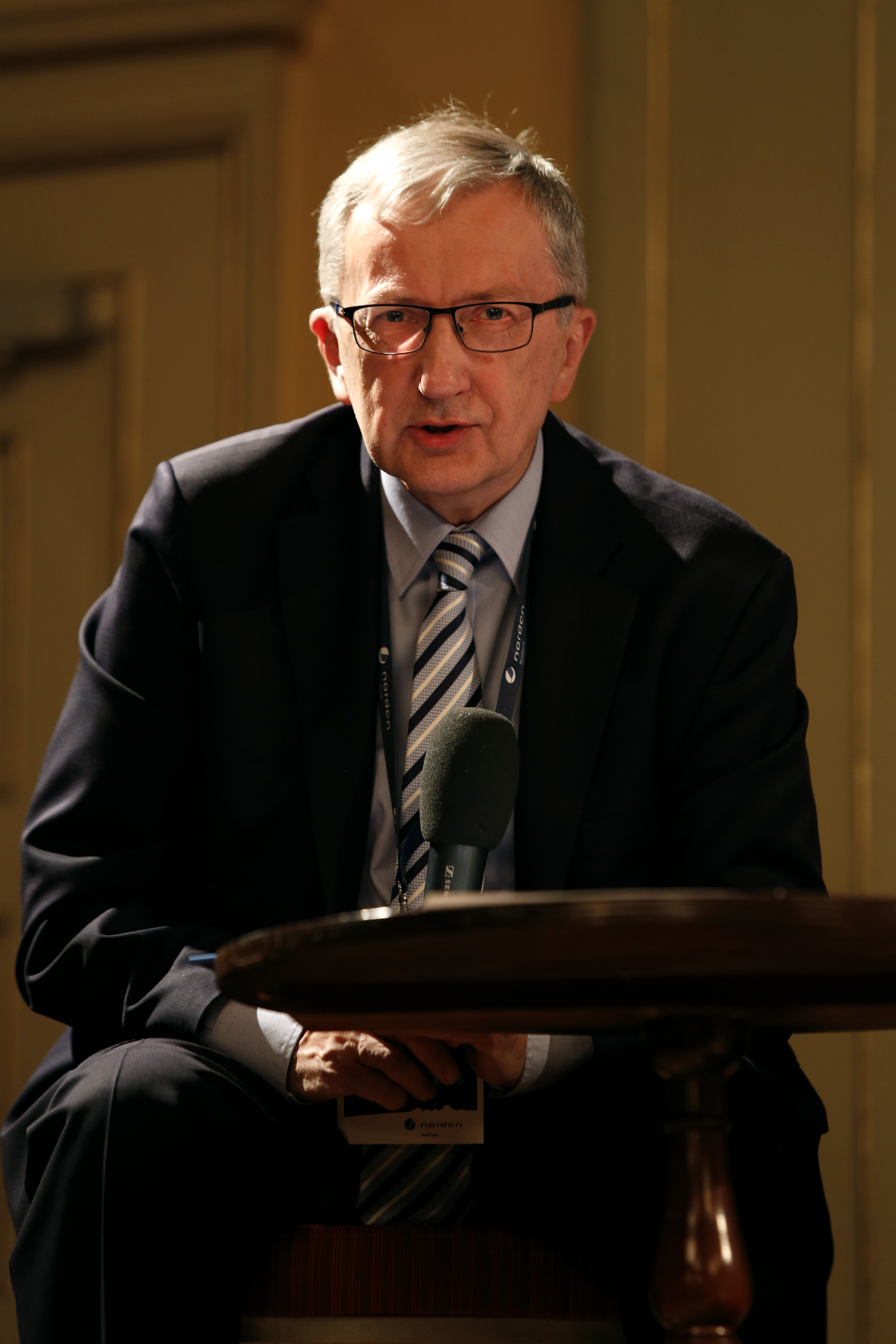
Langer at NordForsk's Anniversary Conference, Oslo 08.10.2015.

Jerzy Marian Langer (born 18 July 1947, Łódź, Poland) is a Polish physicist specializing in condensed matter physics. He is a professor at the Institute of Physics of the Polish Academy of Sciences. Langer is currently an Ambassador for the European Innovation Council for the years 2021-2027.

== Awards and honors ==
Langer became a fellow of the American Physical Society in 1989 "for contributions in the area of defects and recombination phenomena in semiconductors and ionic solids." He is also a fellow of the Warsaw Scientific Society, and Academia Europaea.
