= Research Fund for Coal and Steel =

The Research Fund for Coal and Steel (RFCS) is an EU programme managed by the European Commission, supporting research in the coal and steel sectors in Europe.

When the European Coal and Steel Community Treaty expired in 2002, revenues generated were transferred to the EU to be used to support the RFCS research programme and activities. Every year around €55 million is distributed to coal and steel research projects at universities, research centers and private companies.
