= Emmanuel Stratakis =

Greek physicist

Emmanuel Stratakis is a Greek physicist.

Stratakis earned his bachelor's, master's and doctoral degrees in physics from the University of Crete. He works for the Institute of Electronic structure and laser, a division of the Foundation for Research and Technology—Hellas. Stratakis was elected as a member of the 2022 class of fellows for Optica. He is currently an Ambassador for the European Innovation Council for the years 2021-2027.
