= European Research Council =

Funding body

- Logo

- European Research Council (European Union)
- Abbreviation: ERC
- Formation: 2007
- Purpose: Fund excellent research conducted in Europe
- Location: Brussels
- Coordinates: 50.51°N 4.21°E
- Region served: Participating countries of Horizon Europe
- Owner: European Union
- Budget: €13 billion (2014–2020)
- Website: erc.europa.eu

The European Research Council (ERC) is a public body for funding of scientific and technological research conducted within the European Union (EU). Established by the European Commission in 2007, the ERC is composed of an independent Scientific Council, its governing body consisting of distinguished researchers, and an Executive Agency, in charge of the implementation. It forms part of the framework programme of the union dedicated to research and innovation, Horizon 2020, preceded by the Seventh Research Framework Programme (FP7). The ERC budget is over €13 billion from 2014 – 2020 and comes from the Horizon 2020 programme, a part of the European Union's budget. Under Horizon 2020 it is estimated that around 7,000 ERC grantees will be funded and 42,000 team members supported, including 11,000 doctoral students and almost 16,000 post-doctoral researchers. The ERC awards to individuals are widely considered to be either among the most, or else the most prestigious grant for academics in Europe.

Researchers from any field can compete for the grants that support pioneering projects. The ERC competitions are open to top researchers also from outside the union. The average success rate is about 12%. Five ERC grantees have won Nobel Prizes. Grant applications are assessed by qualified experts. Excellence is the sole criterion for selection; there are neither thematic priorities, nor geographical quotas for funding. The aim is to recognise the best ideas, and confer status and visibility to the best research in Europe, while also attracting talent from abroad.

Along with national funding bodies, the ERC aims to improve the climate for European frontier research. The Scientific Council has been keen to learn from the ERC's peers in national research councils (European and overseas) and to engage in dialogue and appropriate collaboration.

== Background ==
The idea of having a pan-European funding mechanism for basic research has been discussed and supported for a long time. However, its realisation was held back at the political level because the founding treaties of the European Union was interpreted as allowing union funding only to strengthen the scientific and technological base of European industry – that is, only funding for applied research rather than basic research. In conjunction with the Lisbon declaration in 2000, leaders of the EU, in particular the European Commissioner for Research at the time, Philippe Busquin, realised that the European Treaty had to be reinterpreted; a transformation of European economy from traditional manufacturing to a knowledge-based economy has to involve the enhanced support at the European level for science of all kinds, including both fundamental and applied research.

In 2003, a report from the ERC Expert Group (ERCEG), chaired by Professor Federico Mayor, described how the ERC could take shape. In 2004, a high-level expert group was commissioned to further explore the possibilities of creating a European Research Council. This group concluded that the EU should establish an institution to support frontier research. A number of other expert groups, such as one commissioned by the European Science Foundation, another charged with the task of analysing the economic implications of the Lisbon declaration and a high level group commissioned by the European Commission, also arrived at a similar conclusion and boosted the idea. With the ice broken, scientists and politicians have since strongly supported the establishment of an ERC. In 2006, the European Parliament and EU Council of Ministers accepted the Seventh Framework Programme (FP7) for the European Union's support for research, of which the ERC was a flagship component. In the ERC kick-off conference in Berlin, various speakers talked of 'an idea whose time has come', 'a European factory of ideas', 'a champions' league', 'a great day for Europe and a great day for science', and the beginning of a 'snowball effect'.

== Organisation ==
=== Scientific Council ===
The ERC is governed by the Scientific Council (ScC), consisting of 22 eminent European scientists and scholars (including Nobel prize laureates), and supported operationally by the European Research Council Executive Agency (ERCEA), based in Brussels. The ScC acts on behalf of the scientific community in Europe to promote creativity and innovative research. It is responsible for setting the ERC's scientific strategy, including establishing the annual Work Programmes, designing the peer review systems, identifying the peer review experts, and communicating with the scientific community. The first Scientific Council members were nominated by Commissioner Potočnik in July 2005 and worked intensively to define the key principles and scientific operating practices of the ERC in preparation for the start-up.

The members of the Scientific Council are selected by an Identification Committee, consisting of highly respected personalities in European research, and appointed by the European Commission. The ScC members term of office lasts four years.

==== President ====
Following its formal establishment, the Scientific Council reaffirmed the election of its chair and ERC president, Professor Fotis Kafatos, and the two vice-chairs and ERC vice-presidents, Professor Helga Nowotny and Daniel Estève. After the highly successful presidency of Fotis Kafatos, Helga Nowotny took over as president in March 2010 with Carl-Henrik Heldin and Pavel Exner as vice-presidents. In January 2014, after the end of Helga Nowotny's term of office, Professor Jean-Pierre Bourguignon became ERC president. Since then, the ERC also has a third vice-president, Professor Nuria Sebastian Galles, alongside the two vice-presidents already in office (each of them in charge of one of the ERC scientific domains). In May 2019, internationally recognized nanomedicine scientist Mauro Ferrari was named the next president of the European Research Council. 30 June 2021, Professor Maria Leptin was named president of the ERC from 1 October 2021.

List of presidents
Portrait	Term in office	Name	Nationality
First President of the European Research Council	February 2007 – February 2010	Fotis Kafatos	Greece
	March 2010 – January 2014	Helga Nowotny	Austria
	January 2014 – January 2020	Jean-Pierre Bourguignon	France
	January 2020 – April 2020	Mauro Ferrari	Italy
	October 2021 –	Maria Leptin	Germany

==== Standing committees ====
The ERC Scientific Council has established two Standing Committees: one deals with conflict of interest issues, the other oversees the selection of reviewers and panel lists.

=== Executive Agency ===
The Scientific Council is supported operationally by the European Research Council Executive Agency (ERCEA), based in Brussels. The implementing pillar of the ERC, the ERC Executive Agency (ERCEA), is responsible for supporting the peer review process, implementing the ERC strategy as set by the ScC, executing all financial operations and communicating about the ERC. The ERCEA is currently headed by the Director, Laurence MOREAU. It employs some 500 staff of which more than 50 hold PhDs.

Most Scientific staff hold a PhD, have done post-docs and/or have been academics. ERC Schemes are implemented by scientists in order to simplify the application as well as the granting processes with their colleagues from financial units.

==== Steering Committee ====
There is also a five-member ERCEA Steering Committee, chaired by the European Commission's Director-General for Research and Innovation, two ScC members, and two Commission officials.

=== Measures to ensure an integrated institution ===
To create an integrated institution consisting of the ScC and the ERCEA, two integrative mechanisms were initially put in place:

1. The Secretary General (SG), selected by the ScC, was located in Brussels with the goal of interacting closely with the ERCEA. This post no longer exists. The first SG was Professor Ernst-Ludwig Winnacker (2007–2009), who had already initiated the EURYI Award, the precursor of the ERC scheme, in 2003. The second SG was Professor Andreu Mas-Colell (2009–2010). The third and the last SG was Professor Donald Bruce Dingwell (2010–2013). The Secretaries General have been instrumental in the successful setting-up of the ERC, and have worked closely and fruitfully together with the two consecutive Directors ad interim of the ERCEA, Jack Metthey and thereafter Pablo Amor. During the first half of 2011, a Task Force chaired by the European Commission's Research Director-General, Robert-Jan Smits, decided to give further suggestions regarding the governance structure of the ERC in the European Commission's Framework Programme (Horizon 2020), 2014 – 2020. It inter alia suggested to merge the positions of the President and of the Secretary General into a full-time President based in Brussels. This recommendation was implemented as of January 2014; since then, the ERC President is permanently based in Brussels and there is no Secretary General.
2. The ERC Board currently consists of the ERC President, the three vice-presidents, and the Director of the ERCEA.

=== Budget and peer review ===
Under the EU's Framework Programme for Research and Innovation Horizon 2020 the ERC has a budget of €13.1 billion for the period 2014 – 2020. That is a substantial increase from its initial seven-year budget under the EU's seventh Research Framework Programme (2007–2013), when the total allocated to the ERC was €7.5 billion. The ERC budget is supported by the European Commission and is supplemented by contributions from the EU associated countries. Together, the 27 EU member states and the associated countries comprise the European Research Area (ERA).

The ERC's peer-review evaluation process must command the confidence of the research community and is central to the achievement of the ERC's objectives. The ERC Scientific Council divided the full range of scientific disciplines into three major domains, with budgets allotted as follows. The peer review in the three domains is carried out by a total of 28 panels led by Panel Chairs whose scientific status gives credibility to the selection process. The peer review experts come from all over the world, which makes the ERC peer review process one of the most international of its kind on this scale. There are currently about 900 ERC panel members; together with the 2000 external reviewers, they constitute the backbone of the ERC evaluation structure.

Domain	Allotment of budget	Panel		
Domain	Allotment of budget	Name	Discipline	Description of discipline
Physical sciences and engineering (PE)	39%	PE1	Mathematics	All areas of mathematics, pure and applied, plus mathematical foundations of computer science, mathematical physics, and statistics
Physical sciences and engineering (PE)	39%	PE2	Fundamental Constituents of Matter	Particle, nuclear, plasma, atomic, molecular, gas, and optical physics
Physical sciences and engineering (PE)	39%	PE3	Condensed Matter Physics	Structure, electronic properties, fluids, nanosciences, biological physics
Physical sciences and engineering (PE)	39%	PE4	Physical and Analytical Chemical Sciences	Analytical chemistry, chemical theory, physical chemistry/chemical physics
Physical sciences and engineering (PE)	39%	PE5	Synthetic Chemistry and Materials	New materials and new synthetic approaches, structure-properties relations, solid state chemistry, molecular architecture, organic chemistry
Physical sciences and engineering (PE)	39%	PE6	Computer Science and Informatics	Electrical, electronic, communication, optical and systems engineering
Physical sciences and engineering (PE)	39%	PE7	Systems and Communication Engineering	Electronic, communication, optical and systems engineering
Physical sciences and engineering (PE)	39%	PE8	Products and Processes Engineering	Product and process design, chemical, civil, environmental, mechanical, vehicle engineering, energy processes and relevant computational methods
Physical sciences and engineering (PE)	39%	PE9	Universe Sciences	Astro-physics/-chemistry/-biology; solar system; planetary systems; stellar, galactic and extragalactic astronomy; cosmology; space sciences; astronomical instrumentation and data
Physical sciences and engineering (PE)	39%	PE10	Earth System Science	Physical geography, geology, geophysics, atmospheric sciences, oceanography, climatology, cryology, ecology, global environmental change, biogeochemical cycles, natural resources management.
Physical sciences and engineering (PE)	39%	PE11	Materials Engineering	Advanced materials development: performance enhancement, modelling, large-scale preparation, modification, tailoring, optimisation, novel and combined use of materials, etc
Social sciences and humanities (SH)	17%	SH1	Individuals, Markets and Organisations	Economics, finance, management
Social sciences and humanities (SH)	17%	SH2	Institutions, Governance and Legal Systems	Political science, international relations, law
Social sciences and humanities (SH)	17%	SH3	The Social World and Its Interactions	Sociology, social psychology, education sciences, communication studies
Social sciences and humanities (SH)	17%	SH4	The Human Mind and Its Complexity	Cognitive science, psychology, linguistics
Social sciences and humanities (SH)	17%	SH5	Texts and Concepts	Literary studies, literature, philosophy
Social sciences and humanities (SH)	17%	SH6	The Study of the Human Past	Archaeology and history
Social sciences and humanities (SH)	17%	SH7	Human Mobility, Environment, and Space	Human geography, demography, health, sustainability science, territorial planning, spatial analysis
Social sciences and humanities (SH)	17%	SH8	Arts, Cultures and Societies	Anthropology, studies of cultures and the arts
Life sciences (LS)	34%	LS1	Molecules of Life: Biological Mechanisms, Structures and Functions	For all organisms: Molecular biology, biochemistry, structural biology, molecular biophysics, synthetic and chemical biology, drug design, innovative methods and modelling
Life sciences (LS)	34%	LS2	Integrative Biology: From Genes and Genomes to Systems	For all organisms: Genetics, epigenetics, genomics and other ‘omics studies, bioinformatics, systems biology, genetic diseases, gene editing, innovative methods and modelling, ‘omics for personalised medicine
Life sciences (LS)	34%	LS3	Cell Biology, Development, Stem Cells and Regeneration	For all organisms: Structure and function of the cell, cell-cell communication, embryogenesis, tissue differentiation, organogenesis, growth, development, evolution of development, organoids, stem cells, regeneration, therapeutic approaches
Life sciences (LS)	34%	LS4	Physiology in Health, Disease and Ageing	Organ and tissue physiology, comparative physiology, physiology of ageing, pathophysiology, inter-organ and tissue communication, endocrinology, nutrition, metabolism, interaction with the microbiome, non-communicable diseases including cancer (and except disorders of the nervous system and immunity-related diseases)
Life sciences (LS)	34%	LS5	Neuroscience and Disorders of the Nervous System	Nervous system development, homeostasis and ageing, nervous system function and dysfunction, systems neuroscience and modelling, biological basis of cognitive processes and of behaviour, neurological and mental disorders – In humans and all other organisms
Life sciences (LS)	34%	LS6	Immunity, Infection and Immunotherapy	The immune system, related disorders and their mechanisms, biology of infectious agents and infection, biological basis of prevention and treatment of infectious diseases, innovative immunological tools and approaches, including therapies
Life sciences (LS)	34%	LS7	Prevention, Diagnosis and Treatment of Human Diseases	Medical technologies and tools for prevention, diagnosis and treatment of human diseases, therapeutic approaches and interventions, pharmacology, preventative medicine, epidemiology and public health, digital medicine
Life sciences (LS)	34%	LS8	Environmental Biology, Ecology and Evolution	For all organisms: Ecology, biodiversity, environmental change, evolutionary biology, behavioural ecology, microbial ecology, marine biology, ecophysiology, theoretical developments and modelling
Life sciences (LS)	34%	LS9	Biotechnology and Biosystems Engineering	Biotechnology using all organisms, biotechnology for environment and food applications, applied plant and animal sciences, bioengineering and synthetic biology, biomass and biofuels, biohazards

The ScC encourages interdisciplinary proposals.

== Grants offered ==
=== Principles ===
The two founding principles of the ERC regarding grants are:

1. Research grant applications should be judged using the sole criterion of peer-reviewed excellence, independent of political, geographic or economic considerations. All ERC competitions for funding are open to top researchers from any country in the world, as long as they are committed to work at least half of their time in Europe. The quality and originality of the research project and the qualifications of the applicant (as shown, for example, by their publication record) are the only evaluation criteria. This means that there will be no juste retour, in other words there are no guarantees that the individual countries contributing to the programme will receive any part of the funding.
2. Frontier research should be targeted by encouraging high-risk, high-reward proposals that may revolutionise science and potentially lead to innovation if successful. With its bottom-up approach, the Scientific Council does not pre-determine thematic priorities, but challenges applicants to identify them themselves. Funding is provided for individual projects initiated in an investigator-driven, 'bottom‑up' process. Although collaborations within a project are welcome, there is no formal demand to collaborate.

The ERC grants are flexible, so that all costs for a specific project can be covered, and portable, meaning that if grant holders move to another university or institute, the grant moves with them.

The applicant can be of any nationality and age, and needs to demonstrate an excellent track record and present a ground-breaking research proposal. The research must be conducted in a Host Institution located within the European Union or an associated country.

=== Schemes ===
The council offers the following grant schemes, with funding for up to five years:

Name	Qualifications	Max. funding	Aim
Primary grants
Starting Grants	PhD + 2–7 years experience	€1.5 million (+ €0.5 million to cover "start-up" costs)	Supports up-and-coming independent research leaders. This is targeted at promoting early scientific independence of promising talent.
Consolidator Grants	PhD + 7–12 years experience	€2 million (+ €0.75 million)	Supports researchers at the stage at which they are consolidating their own independent research team or programme.
Advanced Grants	10-year excellent scientific track record	€2.5 million (+ €1.0 million)	Supports researchers who have already established themselves as independent research leaders in their own right.
Secondary grants
Proof of Concept Grants	Holder of a previous ERC grant	€150,000	Top-up funding open only to existing grant holders to bring their research ideas closer to market

=== Annual applications ===
The following charts present annual success rates.

==== Starting Grants ====
- Granted
- Refused
- Unevaluated

==== Consolidator Grants ====
- Granted
- Refused
- Unevaluated

==== Advanced Grants ====
- Granted
- Refused
- Unevaluated

=== Availability of publications and results ===
The Scientific Council has adopted an 'open access' policy with regard to the access and availability of publications and research results. This requires all peer-reviewed publications from ERC-funded research projects to be deposited in the appropriate Internet-accessible libraries within six months of publication.

== See also ==
- Directorate-General for Research
- Directorate-General of the Joint Research Centre (European Commission)
- European Research Executive Agency (REA)
- European Innovation Council (EIC)
- European Institute of Technology (EIT)
- European Research Advisory Board (EURAB)
- European Research Area (ERA)
- Framework Programmes for Research and Technological Development
- European Council of Applied Sciences and Engineering (Euro-CASE)
- Information Society Technologies Advisory Group (ISTAG)
- European Defence Fund
- Lisbon Strategy

== Sources ==
- December 2003, Report from Expert Group The European Research Council A Cornerstone in the European Research Area
- Frontier Research: The European Challenge, High Level Expert Group Report, February 2005
- BBC News story of ERC launch – Feb 2007
- Webpage of the Scientific Council of the European Research Council
- EU press release IP/05/956, Scientific Council of the European Research Council announced, released 18 July 2005.
- CORDIS – FP7 (Ideas)
