= Station F =

Startup incubator in Paris

Coordinates: 48.8339°N 2.3713°E

- Logo

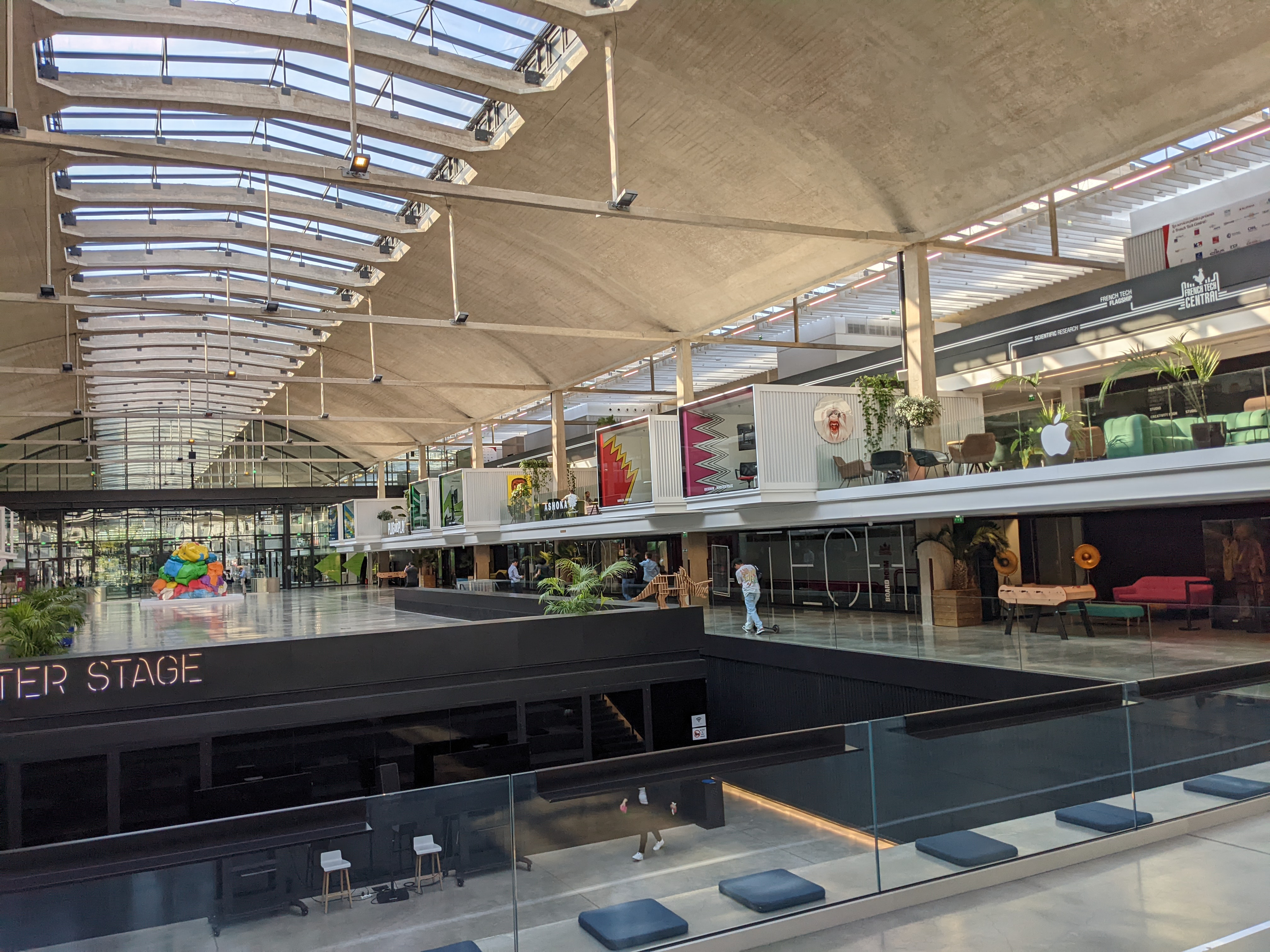
- Formation: 2017
- Purpose: Business incubator
- Location: 5, parvis Alan-Turing, Paris, France
- Key people: Xavier Niel, Roxanne Varza
- Website: www.stationf.co

Station F is a business incubator for startups, located in the 13th arrondissement, Paris, near the François Mitterrand site of the Bibliothèque nationale de France. It is noted as the world's largest startup facility.

Situated in a former rail freight depot previously known as la Halle Freyssinet (thereof the "F" in Station F), the 34,000 m^{2} (370,000 sq ft) facility was formally opened by President Emmanuel Macron in June 2017 and provides office accommodation for up to 1,000 start-up and early stage businesses as well as for corporate partners such as Facebook, Microsoft and Naver.

In the first five years of its existence, it supported more than 5,000 French startups with 92.4% still in operation. Hugging Face was its first unicorn company. It is estimated that during these first five years, its companies raised more than 8 billion euros and directly created 47,200 jobs.

== Building facilities ==
Station F occupies a building designed by French engineer Eugène Freyssinet. First opened in 1929, the former rail depot has been extensively remodeled by architects Wilmotte and Associates to meet the needs of small start-up companies.

As well as 3,000 desk spaces and private meeting facilities, the incubator also hosts a 370-seat auditorium and dining facilities open to the public. Facebook's own Startup Garage in the building will host up to 15 companies on a six monthly cycle and represents the company's first physical space dedicated to startups.

The campus also houses La Felicità, the largest restaurant in Europe, with 4,500 square meters (48,000 sq ft) from the Big Mamma restaurant group. This giant food court comprises five different Italian eateries.

== Partnerships ==
Through various partnerships, Station F has also accepted foreign startups, for example Swedish and Korean.

Station F has a number of corporate partnerships for start up programs geared for entrepreneurs. Partners include Facebook, Google, Microsoft, Ubisoft, and Zendesk.
