= European Institute of Innovation and Technology =

Research institute, independent EU body

European Institute of Innovation and Technology (EIT)
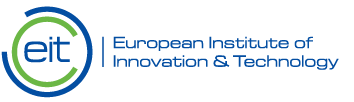
- Established: 11 March 2008
- Focus: Innovation & Technology
- Chair: Stefan Dobrev (Chairperson of the EIT Governing Board & Executive Committee )
- Head: Martin Kern (Director)
- Budget: €3 billion for 2021-2027
- Address: Infopark - Building E, Neumann Janos utca, 1117 Budapest
- Location: (European Union) Budapest, Hungary and across the EU member states
- Website: eit.europa.eu

The European Institute of Innovation and Technology (EIT) is an independent body of the European Union with juridical personality, established in 2008 intended to strengthen Europe's ability to innovate. The EIT's three "core pillars" of activities are entrepreneurial education programmes and courses across Europe that transform students into entrepreneurs; business creation and acceleration services that scale ideas and budding businesses; and innovation-driven research projects that turn ideas into products by connecting partners, investors, and expertise.

As part of the EU's Framework Program for Research and Innovation "Horizon Europe" under Pillar 3 "Innovative Europe", the EIT contributes to achieving the four key strategic orientations of the Horizon Europe Strategic Plan. These are: promoting an open strategic autonomy by leading the development of key digital, enabling and emerging technologies, sectors and value chains; restoring Europe’s ecosystems and biodiversity and managing sustainably natural resources; making Europe the first digitally-enabled circular, climate-neutral and sustainable economy; creating a more resilient, inclusive and democratic European society. The EIT is funded through Horizon Europe.

In total, ten KICs (Knowledge and Innovation Communities) have been created by the EIT since its creation in 2010.

== Organisation ==
=== Governing Board ===
The EIT Governing Board is the principal governing body entrusted with the strategic leadership of the Institute and the overall direction of its operational activities. It is autonomous in its decision-making and is responsible for the selection, evaluation, and support given to the EIT Knowledge and Innovation Communities (KICs).

The Governing Board brings together 15 experts from higher education, research, business, and innovation. Members have a four-year non-renewable term of office and are appointed by the European Commission. The appointment process takes into consideration the balance between higher education, research, innovation, and business experience as well as gender and geographical representation.

Stefan Dobrev was elected Chairperson of the EIT Governing Board and Executive Committee and took over on 1 July 2024.

=== Management team and executive directors ===
The EIT Director is supported by the Director's office and a legal section, together with the Heads of Operations I, II, and the Administrative Unit. The current Director of the EIT is Martin Kern.

=== Participation and funding ===
The EIT is part of the Horizon Europe Framework Programme for Research and Innovation 2021–2027. At the start of 2021, it became part of Pillar 3 – Open Innovation of Horizon Europe. The Horizon Europe Regulation states that the KICs are institutionalised European Partnerships and, as such, they shall deliver clear impacts for the European Union and their citizens.

=== EIT Member State Representatives Group (MSRG) ===
The new EIT Regulation and the EIT Strategic Innovation Agenda for 2021–2027 established the EIT Member State Representatives Group (MSRG). The MSRG advises the EIT Governing Board and the EIT Director on strategically important issues, such as the extension or termination of the EIT's partnership agreements and the conclusion of a memorandum of cooperation with each KIC. It also facilitates interaction between EIT Community and national or regional activities, sharing information about potential national and regional co-financing.

The MSRG is composed of a representative and a substitute from each EU Member State and each Associated Country to Horizon Europe. They are delegated at the invitation of the European Commission. Members come from ministries or national authorities responsible for the EIT and must demonstrate relevant knowledge and understanding of Horizon Europe, as well as national and EU-level innovation policies.

The MSRG meets at least twice a year and is co-chaired by the EIT Director and a Representative nominated by the MSRG. Representatives of the European Commission (from DG EAC), the EIT Governing Board, and the CEOs of the KICs may be invited to attend the meetings to align better the work carried out by the group.

== History ==
=== Foundation and objective ===
A 'European Institute of Technology' was first proposed by the European Commission in September 2006, with a proposal planned for October the same year.

On 11 March 2008, the European Parliament and the Council signed Regulation (EC) No 294/2008, establishing the European Institute of Innovation and Technology. The goal was to foster the integration of the knowledge triangle—higher education, research, and innovation—across the European Union under organizations called Knowledge and Innovation Communities (KICs). Each KIC would have a strategic mission and would be financially supported by the EIT during 15 years, by which it would have to achieve financial sustainability. Decreasing EIT funding rates for KIC added-value activities shall be applicable across phases of the KICs' entire life cycle (start-up, ramp-up, maturity, exit from the EIT grant. The rationale behind the establishment of the EIT was the EU's attempt to re-launch its Lisbon Strategy, signed in 2000, focusing on a 'growth and job' agenda. The EIT was, therefore, an attempt to redefine the European Commission mandates and governance of higher education institutions as part of a knowledge-based economy route to economic and social development.

On 18 June 2008, HQ were established in Budapest, Hungary, and on 15 September 2008 the inaugural meeting of EIT Governing Board was held. There, Martin Schuurmans was elected Chair of the Board.

=== Initial phase (2008–2011) ===
As determined in the Regulation establishing EIT, within 12 months after its creation, the Governing Board had to submit the draft of the first rolling triennial work programme and, within a period of 18 months, select and designate two or three KICs.

The topics of the first wave of KICs (climate, energy, digital) were selected based on the criteria for selection described in Article 7 ("Selection of KICs") in December 2009. Article 7 was open to some degree of interpretation and the Governing Board working group was essential in shaping a common understanding of each potential KIC. For instance, the concept of EIT Climate-KIC (now Climate KIC) was defined as climate change mitigation and adaptation; KIC InnoEnergy (now InnoEnergy) was focused on sustainable energy sources; and EIT ICT Labs (now 28Digital) put emphasis not only on digital technology but on the future of social information sharing and communication.

=== Consolidation (2012–2013) ===
The EIT’s main goal for 2012 was to move from an initial start-up phase to a consolidation of activities with the existing three KICs, as well as to start preparations for an enlarged KIC portfolio in the future. Scaling up was done through the pilot implementation of EIT-labelled degrees with the goal of creating role models for the kind of education it wanted to promote. That meant hands-on entrepreneurial education that addressed topical issues such as the climate crisis, finding alternative power source solutions, and technological advances to improve people’s lives.

All three KICs accelerated the enlargement of their project portfolio through MSc, Master’s, and Doctoral programmes. During these two years, EIT-labelled programmes allowed the EIT to raise awareness of its activities and value proposition for society among external stakeholders.

=== As part of Horizon 2020 (2014-2020) ===
Horizon 2020 was adapted in 2013 to reduce the fragmentation of European research and industry and refocus their efforts on UN SDG-related issues. Its implementation would be partly carried out by the EIT, who would use the KICs to overcome Europe’s fragmentation. The EIT’s budget was expanded to €2.7 billion for the 2014 to 2020 to meet Horizon 2020 objectives.

Based on the Strategic Innovation Agenda (SIA) of the EIT for 2014–2020, a call for proposals was announced in 2014 with two distinct thematical areas. One was for innovation for healthy living and active ageing (EIT Health) and the second was raw materials—sustainable explorations, extraction, processing, recycling, and substitution (EIT RawMaterials). The SIA also set the themes for 2016 and 2018 calls to establish an additional three KICs in the themes of Food4Future (now EIT Food), added-value manufacturing (now EIT Manufacturing), and eco-friendly urban mobility (EIT Urban Mobility). During this period, the eight KIC EIT structure was established to contribute to a larger EU policy agenda and, specifically, Horizon 2020.

Additionally, the RIS Scheme was introduced as an answer to underrepresentation of innovation start-ups and education for entrepreneurs in non-EU countries. The scheme seeks out and nurtures new partnerships with research and education institutions in RIS countries. Its funding mobility programmes offer students, researchers, and entrepreneurs of any age the chance to gain new skills. In 2017, the EIT expanded the total EIT RIS countries to 18.

That same year, Forbes chose 18 EIT Community members for the annual Forbes 30 Under 30 list.

In 2018, the EIT and its KICs established the EIT Global Outreach Programme, the first EIT Community-coordinated effort at the global level. It expanded the reach of the EIT Community to non-European partners.

In 2020, the EIT launched the EIT Crisis Response Initiative which mobilised 60 million in additional funding for the Community to launch new projects dealing directly with the COVID-19 pandemic and its socioeconomic fallout.

=== As part of Horizon Europe (2021–2027) ===
For the budget period of 2021–2027, the EIT was mandated by the EU Parliament and Council to deliver on Horizon Europe objectives.

Between 2021 and 2027, the EIT should:

- Increase the impact of its activities
- Create two new KICs:
  1. Cultural and Creative Sectors and Industries (established in June 2022 under the name EIT Culture & Creativity)
  2. Water, Marine and Maritime Sectors and Ecosystems (established in November 2025 under the name EIT Water)
- Put more emphasis on the regional dimensions of its activities by providing targeted support to countries who lag in innovation performance
- Launch a new pilot initiative to increase the entrepreneurial and innovation capacity of higher education institutions.

In March 2021, the EIT opened its liaison office in Brussels, ensuring close working ties with stakeholders like the EU Commission and the EU Parliament. 2021 also saw the launch of the HEI Initiative: Innovation Capacity Building for Higher Education, addressing one of the key objectives of the EIT's SIA 2021–2027. The HEI Initiative helps coordinate cross-sectoral activities related to education and gives a wider circle of future entrepreneurs access to the EIT Community's experience and knowledge. Several projects were developed through this initiative: Skills for Future, Girls go Circular, and Women in AgriFood.

In light of a full-scale war against Ukraine started by Russia on February 24, 2022, the EIT together with several KICs initiated activities to help Ukrainians. These included providing traineeships and professional development, as well as initiating projects aimed at post-war reconstruction.

== Budget 2021–2027 ==
In the EU Parliament and Council Decision of 20 May 2021, which sets the 2021–2027 EIT Agenda, the budget needs of the EIT were set at €2,965,000,000. €2,854,000,000 (96% of the total EIT budget) is envisaged to fund existing and new KICs, of which:

- at least 10% and a maximum of 15% shall be dedicated to the RIS
- a maximum of 7% shall be dedicated to cross-KIC activities, including support for KICs, for which the partnership agreement is expired or terminated
- a maximum of 3% shall be dedicated to a pilot higher education initiative of three years.

== Collaborations ==
The EIT signed a Memorandum of Understanding (MoU) with several European organisations and countries, including:

- The European Union Agency for Law Enforcement Training, formerly known as European Police College (CEPOL) (27 October 2014)
- The Joint Research Centre (JRC) (22 September 2016)
- The European Union Intellectual Property Office (EUIPO) (8 October 2020)
- The European Innovation Council (EIC) (8 January 2021)
- The European Investment Fund (EIF) (20 September 2021)
- The European Investment Bank (EIB) (20 September 2021)
- The European Cooperation in Science and Technology (COST) (19 April 2022, renewed 22 May 2025)
- The Ministry of Economic Development and Technology of Poland, to launch the EIT Regional Innovation Booster (EIT RIB) pilot in Poland (12 May 2025)
- The Government of Malta, to launch the EIT Regional Innovation Booster (EIT RIB) pilot in the country and further strengthen cooperation and support the country’s innovation ecosystem (25 November 2025)
- The Hungarian Ministry of Culture and Innovation, to launch the EIT Regional Innovation Booster (EIT RIB) pilot in the country (2 December 2025)

== See also ==
- Agencies of the European Union
- Lisbon Strategy
- European Research Area (ERA)
- European Research Council (ERC)
- Framework Programmes for Research and Technological Development
- Science and Technology in Europe
- Joint Research Centre (JRC)
- European Innovation Council (EIC)
- European Investment Fund (EIF)
- European Investment Bank (EIB)
- European Union Intellectual Property Office (EUIPO)
- European Union Agency for Law Enforcement Training (CEPOL)
