= Directorate-General for Research and Innovation =

Directorate-General of the European Commission

The Directorate-General for Research and Innovation (DG RTD) is a Directorate-General of the European Commission, located in Brussels, and responsible for the European Union's research and innovation policy and coordination of research and innovation activities. Since September 2023, it is headed by Commissioner Ekaterina Zaharieva and Director-General Marc Lemaître.

== Mission ==
The Directorate-General for Research and Innovation defines and implements European Research and Innovation (R&I) policy with a view to achieving the goals of the Europe 2020 strategy and its key flagship initiative, the Innovation Union.

To do so, DG RTD contributes to the European Semester by analysing national R&I policies, by assessing their strengths and weaknesses, and by formulating country specific recommendations where necessary. It monitors and contributes to the realisation of the Innovation Union flagship initiative and the completion of the European Research Area. It funds Research and Innovation through Framework Programmes (currently Horizon 2020) taking a strategic programming approach.

=== Long-term objective (2020) ===
To make Europe a better place to live and work, by developing and implementing R&I policy to improve Europe's competitiveness, boost its growth, create jobs, and tackle the main current and future societal challenges.

== Management ==
- Commissioner: Ekaterina Zaharieva
- Director General: Marc Lemaître
- Deputy Director-General for Planet, People and Science for Policy: Joanna Drake
- Deputy Director-General for Innovation, Prosperity and International Cooperation: Maria Cristina Russo

== Structure ==
To fulfil its mission, the Directorate General works closely with several other Commission departments (DGs) and executive agencies.

== See also ==
- European Commissioner for Innovation, Research, Culture, Education and Youth
- EURATOM
- EURODOC
- European Charter for Researchers
- European Institute of Technology (EIT)
- European Research Council (ERC)
- Horizon 2020
- Joint Research Centre (a DG of the European Commission)
- Lisbon Strategy
- Science and technology in Europe
- Scientific Advice Mechanism
