= Joint Research Centre =

European Commission's science and knowledge service

Official logo of the JRC.

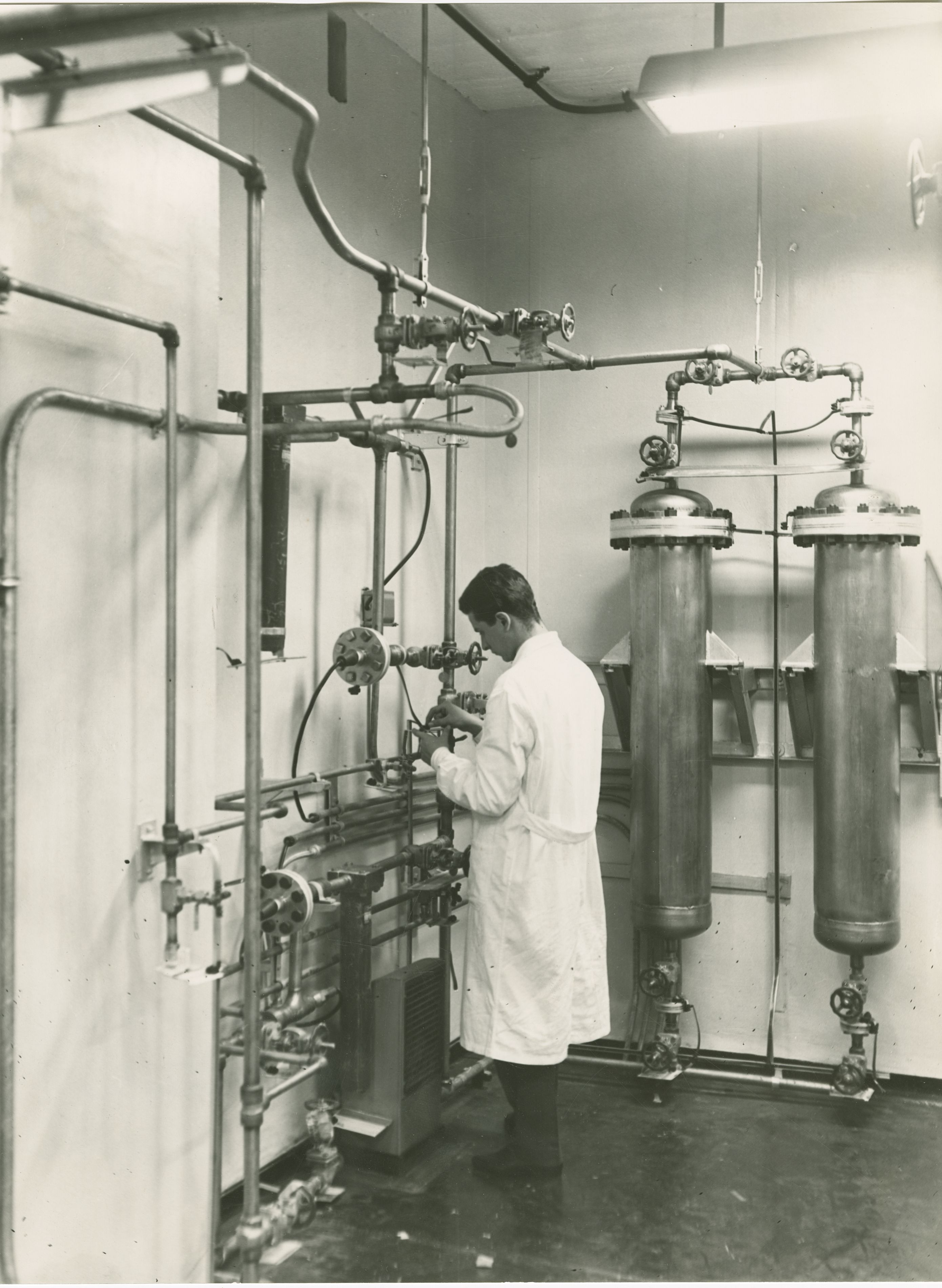
Ispra-1 in 1959

The Joint Research Centre (JRC) is the European Commission's science and knowledge service which employs scientists to carry out research in order to provide independent scientific advice and support to European Union (EU) policy.

== Leadership ==
The JRC is a directorate-general of the European Commission under the responsibility of Ekaterina Zaharieva, the European Commissioner for Startups, Research and Innovation. The current Director-General of the JRC is Bernard Magenhann. Its Board of Governors assists and advises the Director-General on matters relating to the role and the scientific, technical and financial management of the JRC.

== Structure ==
Composed of scientific, as well as strategy, resource and IT directorates, the JRC is spread across six sites in five EU countries: in Belgium (Brussels and Geel), Germany (Karlsruhe), Italy (Ispra), the Netherlands (Petten), and Spain (Seville).

== Responsibilities ==
Scientists at the JRC carry out research in various fields to provide independent advice to EU policymakers and put science at the heart of European policies.

The JRC was originally established under the Euratom Treaty, and the JRC has longstanding expertise in the nuclear field, but offers scientific competences from a wide range of disciplines to support almost all EU policy areas.

The JRC works with research and policy organisations in EU countries, European institutions and agencies, and scientific partners in Europe and worldwide.

== History ==
The JRC site in Ispra originally belonged to the Comitato Nazionale per l'Energia Nucleare (CNEN) and was officially transferred to the Community on 1 March 1961. Since 1973, non-nuclear research evolved rapidly, especially in topics related to safety and the environment. After 16 years of research, the nuclear reactor at JRC Ispra was shut down in 1983.

At the beginning of the 1980s, a re-examination of the mandate and evaluation of the activities of the JRC began. Future activities were to continue to support the commission's implementations of Community policies.

The JRC employs around 2700 staff with an annual budget of 372,5 million euros for 2017.

=== List of Directors General ===
- Bernard Magenhann: current
- Bernard Magenhann (Acting): 2024-2025
- Stephen Quest: 2020-2024
- Vladimír Šucha: 2014-2019
- Dominique Ristori: 2010-2013
- Roland Schenkel: 2005-2010
- Barry McSweeney: 2000-2004
- Herbert Allgeier: 1998-2000
- Jean-Pierre Contzen: 1986-1997
- Jean-Albert Dinkespiler: 1982-1985
- Stelio Villani: 1974-1982

== Science areas ==
As of 2025, JRC research activities are clustered into 25 'portfolios', designed to support the priorities of the 2024-2029 European Commission:

- AI and data
- Anticipation, risks, resilience
- Climate and water resilience
- Climate neutrality
- Democracy and public governance
- Demography and migration
- Digital transformation, cybersecurity
- Drivers of competitiveness
- Earth intelligence
- Energy solutions
- Foresight and innovative policymaking
- Global Gateway and neighbourhood
- Green and just transition
- Health
- Nuclear safeguards
- Nuclear safety and skills
- Security and law enforcement
- Small modular reactors
- Socio-economic and territorial impact
- Space, security and defence
- Strategic technologies for economic security
- Sustainable food systems
- Sustainable materials and products
- Transport and mobility
- Zero pollution and biodiversity

== See also ==
- Horizon Europe
- European Research Area (ERA)
- European Research Council (ERC)
- European Institute of Technology (EIT)
- European Research Advisory Board (EURAB)
- Scientific Advice Mechanism
