= European Research Area =

System of scientific research programs in the EU

The European Research Area (ERA) is a system of scientific research programs integrating the scientific resources of the European Union (EU). Since its inception in 2000, the structure has been concentrated on European cooperation in the fields of medical, environmental, industrial, and socioeconomic research. The ERA can be likened to a research and innovation equivalent of the European "common market" for goods and services. Its purpose is to increase the competitiveness of European research institutions by bringing them together and encouraging a more inclusive way of work, similar to what already exists among institutions in North America and Japan. Increased mobility of knowledge workers and deepened multilateral cooperation among research institutions among the member states of the European Union are central goals of the ERA.

Section 1 in article 179 of the Treaty on the Functioning of the European Union states the following:

The Union shall have the objective of strengthening its scientific and technological bases by achieving a European research area in which researchers, scientific knowledge and technology circulate freely, and encouraging it to become more competitive, including in its industry, while promoting all the research activities deemed necessary by virtue of other Chapters of the Treaties.

== History ==
The creation of a European Research Area (ERA) was proposed by the European Commission in its communication Towards a European Research Area of January 2000. The objective of creating ERA was endorsed by the EU shortly afterwards at the March 2000 Lisbon European Council.

In 2002, the Barcelona European Council set a target for EU R&D investment intensity to approach 3% of GDP. Subsequently, the Commission proposed an extensive action plan to increase and improve R&D expenditure in Europe and all Member States set national R&D investment targets linked to the overall 3% objective.

Policy coordination in the ERA was addressed by The Spring European Council of March 2003 through the "open method of coordination", introduced by the Lisbon European Council in 2000, when it agreed to apply the OMC for policies related to investment in research, as well as to human resources and mobility of researchers.

In 2006, the EU adopted a broad-based innovation strategy aiming to improve the framework conditions for research and innovation. In this context, for example, a modernised Community framework for State aid for research and innovation was adopted in November 2006, and initiatives have been taken to support the emergence of European 'lead markets' in promising technology-intensive sectors.

Initiatives were launched to improve the coordination of research activities and programmes. They include the European Technology Platforms, through which industry and other stakeholders develop shared long-term visions and strategic research agendas in areas of business interest, and the bottom-up ERA-Net scheme which supports the coordination of national and regional programmes.

The EU Research Framework Programmes were explicitly designed to support the creation of ERA. New initiatives launched in conjunction with the 7th Framework Programme (2007-2013), such as the European Research Council, have an important impact on the European research landscape. The European Institute of Innovation and Technology should also play a substantial role in creating world-class "knowledge and innovation communities".

EU cohesion policy and its financial instruments – the Structural Funds – give strong priority to the development of research and innovation capacities, particularly in less developed regions. Together with the priority given in most Member States' internal policies, this can help the whole of Europe to participate in and derive full benefit from the European Research Area.

Instruments for public to public partnerships like Joint Programming Initiatives, the ERA-NET Scheme and Article 185 Initiatives have been developed to promote coordination between the national research funding organizations. This resulted in networking activities and the launch of transnational joint calls for research projects. In 2017 more than 100 countries participated in about 90 active P2P research networks.

The Commission decided to give renewed impetus to the construction of ERA in 2007. It published a Green Paper on ERA calling to end the fragmentation of the European research landscape. A wide public consultation confirmed the main policy orientations set out in the Green Paper.

Following this, in 2008 the Member States and the Commission launched a new political partnership, called the "Ljubljana Process", to overcome fragmentation and build a strong ERA. The ultimate aim of the Ljubljana Process was to establish "the fundamental role of ERA as a primary pillar for the Lisbon objectives and as an engine for driving the competitiveness of Europe". The adoption on 2 December 2008 of the European Research Area Vision 2020 by the Council marks a key milestone in the Ljubljana Process.

In its Resolution of 7 December 2009 on enhanced governance of the ERA the Council invited the Commission to continue and further develop systematic and structured consultations with Member States and other relevant stakeholders in a transparent manner and has launched the process of redefining the mission of CREST.

In parallel, following Commission proposals, the Member States launched "partnership" initiatives to increase cooperation in five areas the careers, working conditions and mobility of researchers; the joint design and operation of research programmes; the creation of world-class European research infrastructures; the transfer of knowledge and cooperation between public research and industry and international cooperation in science and technology.

== See also ==
- Lisbon Strategy
- Bologna process
- Framework Programmes for Research and Technological Development
- Sixth Framework Programme
- Seventh Framework Programme
- Directorate-General of the Joint Research Centre
- Directorate-General for Research
- EuroScience
- European Research Council (ERC)
- European Grid Initiative (EGI)
- European Institute of Technology (EIT)
- European Research Advisory Board (EURAB)
- European Council of Applied Sciences and Engineering (Euro-CASE)
- European Higher Education Area (EHEA)
