= Horizon Europe =

European Union research program

European Union Associated non-EU Members

Horizon Europe is a seven-year European Union scientific research initiative to help develop a sustainable and livable society in Europe. It is the ninth of the Framework Programmes for Research and Technological Development (FP9), and the successor of the Horizon 2020 programme (FP8). The European Commission drafted and approved a plan for Horizon Europe to raise EU science spending levels by 50% over the years 2021–2027.

== Objectives ==
Horizon Europe adopts five missions:

1. Adaptation to Climate Change: support at least 150 European regions and communities to become climate resilient by 2030
2. Cancer: working with Europe's Beating Cancer Plan to improve the lives of more than 3 million people by 2030 through disease prevention, cure and solutions to live longer and better
3. Restore our Ocean and Waters by 2030
4. 100 Climate-Neutral and Smart Cities by 2030
5. A Soil Deal for Europe: 100 living labs and lighthouses to lead the transition towards healthy soils by 2030

== Budget ==
In May 2018, the proposal for Horizon Europe (as the future successor for the Horizon 2020 programme, 2014–2020) called for €100 billion in research and innovation spending for years 2021–2027. Of that sum, €2.4 billion was earmarked for the Euratom nuclear research programme and €3.6 billion was put away for an umbrella investment fund, called InvestEU. After accounting for 2% annual inflation, in 2018 the funding for Horizon Europe amounted to €86.6 billion.

The budget of €95.5 billion for Horizon Europe, which was launched in 2021, is up from the €77 billion budget for its predecessor, Horizon 2020. Compared to the previous framework programme Horizon 2020, some changes in terms of cost reporting have been implemented with the objective to simplify the grant management process. To pay for the €100 billion science spending, the commission's plan called for cuts to agriculture and cohesion funding by 5 per cent. Additionally, the plan seeks to tie funding to adherence to the rule of law in member states, including judicial independence.

Independent observers had predicted the final approved funding to be much lower after completion of the lengthy negotiations with the European Parliament and EU member states. Former EU commissioner for Research, Science and Innovation Carlos Moedas, along with many advocacy groups, had pushed for a more expansive EU science budget. In order to build political support for the budget increase, he used American originated ideas of "moonshots" to focus research efforts and boost the public interest. Wealthier EU members have expressed opposition to the increase in funding, with former Dutch prime minister Mark Rutte saying in May 2018 the draft budget was "unacceptable".

== Project types ==
Horizon Europe funds different types of collaborative projects including:

- Research and innovation action (RIA): Its primary purpose is the establishment of new knowledge or the exploration of a novel or substantially improved technology, product, process, service, or solution.
- Innovation action (IA) designed to support activities that are closer to the market than typical research. Its main objective is to drive innovation by bringing new or significantly improved products, processes, or services to a validated stage.
- Coordination and support action (CSA) dedicated to promoting cooperation between legal entities across the EU and its Associated Countries. The ultimate goal of CSAs is to strengthen the European Research Area
- Programme co-fund action (COFUND) that provides multi-annual co-funding for European partnerships bringing together public and private partners.

== EU members of Horizon Europe ==
- Austria
- Belgium
- Bulgaria
- Croatia
- Cyprus
- Czech Republic
- Denmark
- Estonia
- Finland
- France
- Germany
- Greece
- Hungary
- Ireland
- Italy
- Latvia
- Lithuania
- Luxembourg
- Malta
- Netherlands
- Poland
- Portugal
- Romania
- Slovakia
- Slovenia
- Spain
- Sweden

== Cooperation beyond the EU and associated members ==
Horizon Europe supports European partnerships in which the EU, national authorities and / or the private sector jointly commit to support the development and implementation of a programme of research and innovation activities. To be deemed a Horizon Europe Associated Member is to engage in "the closest form of cooperation in research and innovation for non-EU countries, by providing, as far as possible, the same rights and obligations to these countries' research and innovation entities as those accorded to entities of EU Member States." Associated Countries are "non-EU countries that pay into the Horizon Europe budget to be treated equally to the EU Member States for the purposes of the programme."

Horizon Europe partnerships have raised questions about possible use in military technology development responsible for human rights abuses. In 2024, an in-depth study carried out by Statewatch and Informationsstelle Militarisierung (IMI) found that millions of euros in Horizon funding had been used to develop military drone technology used against civilians in Gaza, despite strict prohibitions on the use of Horizon funding for military application in the EU Treaties.

Horizon Europe expanded its partnerships beyond the 27 member states of the EU, including the following:

Associated non-EU countries
| State | Joined | Note | Ref |
|---|---|---|---|
| Albania | 2022/07/01 | | |
| Armenia | 2021/01/01 | Agreement signed on 12 November 2021, retroactive to 1 January 2021. | |
| Australia | 2026/11/12 | Associated to Pillar II only. Agreement signed on 12 November 2026. | |
| Bosnia and Herzegovina | 2021/01/01 | Agreement signed on 6 December 2021, retroactive to 1 January 2021. | |
| Canada | 2024/01/01 | Associated to Pillar II only. Association agreement was signed on 3 July 2024, retroactive to 1 January 2024. | |
| Egypt | 2025/04/10 | | |
| Faroe Islands | 2022/06/01 | | |
| Georgia | 2021/12/17 | | |
| Iceland | 2021/10/06 | | |
| Israel | 2021/12/17 | | |
| Japan | 2026/07/30 | On 30 July 2026, the country became the organization's largest member, Japan's association will finance Horizon Europe Pillar II, which has a budget of 52.4 billion euros. | |
| Kosovo | 2021/12/17 | | |
| Moldova | 2021/11/22 | | |
| Montenegro | 2021/12/17 | | |
| New Zealand | 2023/01/01 | Associated to Pillar II only. Association agreement was signed on 9 July 2023, retroactive to 1 January 2023. | |
| North Macedonia | 2021/12/17 | | |
| Norway | 2021/10/06 | | |
| Serbia | 2021/01/01 | Agreement signed on 6 December 2021, retroactive to 1 January 2021. | |
| South Korea | 2025/01/01 | The first Asian country to participate as an associated country in Horizon Europe. | |
| Switzerland | 2025/11/10 | Rejoined framework programmes after reaching agreement in December 2024. | |
| Tunisia | 2021/01/01 | Agreement signed on 29 March 2022, retroactive to 1 January 2021. | |
| Turkey | 2021/01/01 | | |
| Ukraine | 2021/01/01 | The Agreement entered into force in June 2022, "associated third country" status was applied retroactively from 1 January 2021. | |
| United Kingdom | 2024/01/01 | Associated to the entire programme, with the only exception of the EIC fund. | |

- In August 2022, the United Kingdom launched formal dispute resolution proceedings over its access to the programme. In September 2023, the United Kingdom and European Union reached an agreement on the UK rejoining Horizon starting from 1 January 2024.
- Participants from non-associated non-EU countries, can participate in Horizon Europe actions, but not always with funding.

In addition, the following countries are interested in exploring the concept of association to Horizon Europe:

| State | Note | Ref |
|---|---|---|
| Argentina | Talks about nuclear power | |
| India | Negotiations concluded in 2026. Association expected in 2027. | |
| Morocco | Negotiations paused. | |
| Singapore | Expressed its interest to launch exploratory discussions. | |
| United States | Nuclear energy talks | |

== See also ==
- Science and technology in Europe
