= Energy policy of the European Union =

Legislation in the area of energetics in the European Union

European Union total primary energy consumption by fuel in 2017
1. Oil (38.0%)
2. Coal (14.0%)
3. Natural gas (24.0%)
4. Nuclear (11.0%)
5. Hydro (4.00%)
6. Other renewables (9.00%)

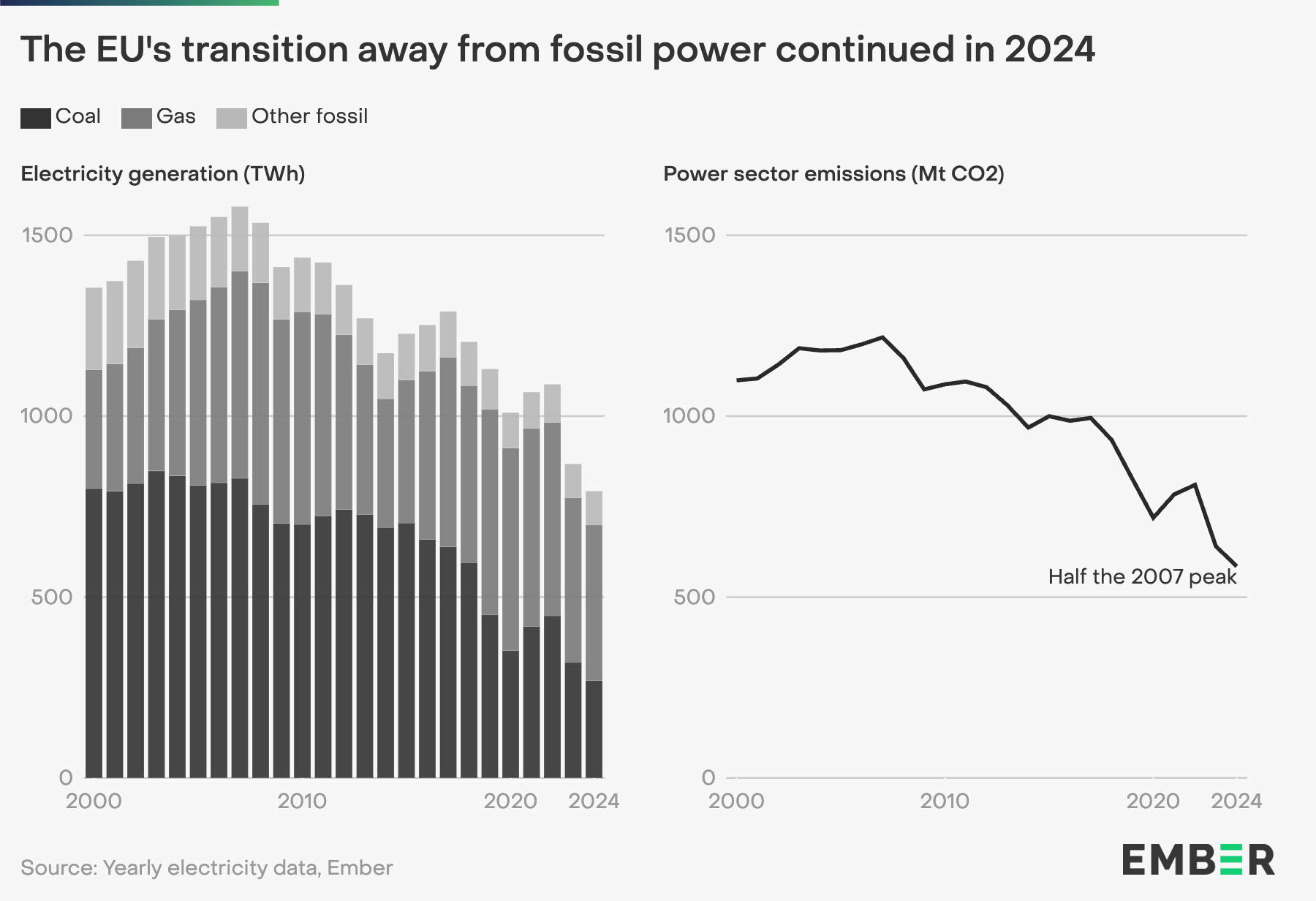
The EU has been transitioning away from fossil fuels.

The energy policy of the European Union focuses on ensuring energy security and affordability, integrating the energy markets of European Union member states, improving energy efficiency, expanding renewable energy and reducing greenhouse gas emissions.

Climate policy has become a central part of EU energy policy, particularly through the European Green Deal and the Fit for 55 package. The EU has set a target of reducing greenhouse gas emissions by at least 55 % by 2030 compared with 1990 levels and aims to achieve climate neutrality by 2050.

Following the Russian invasion of Ukraine in 2022, energy security became a renewed priority of EU policy. The REPowerEU plan seeks to reduce dependence on Russian fossil fuels through faster deployment of renewable energy, improved energy efficiency and investment in energy infrastructure.

EU energy policy has developed as European integration has progressed, from cooperation on coal and nuclear energy to a shared energy market. In 2007, Treaty of Lisbon established energy policy as an explicit area of EU competence.

== History ==
=== Early days ===
The history of energy markets in Europe started with the ECSC (European Coal and Steel Community), which was created in 1951 in the aftermath of World War II. A second key moment was the formation in 1957 Euratom, to collaborate on nuclear energy. The Treaty of Rome (signed on 25 March 1957; started on 1 January 1958) established the free movement of goods, which was intended to create a single market also for energy. Three decades later, integration of energy markets had yet to take place.

The 1973 oil price crisis and the 1979 oil price crisis In the late 1980s, the European Commission proposed a set of policies (called directives in the EU context) on integrating the European market. One of the key ideas was that consumers would be able to buy electricity from outside of their own country. This plan encountered opposition from the Council of Ministers, as the policy sought to liberalise what was regarded as a natural monopoly. The less controversial parts of the directives—those on price transparency and transit right for grid operators—were adopted in 1990.

=== Start of an internal market ===
The 1992 Treaty of Maastricht, which founded the European Union, included no chapter specific on energy. Such a chapter had been rejected by member states who wanted to retain autonomy on energy, specifically those with larger energy reserves. A directive for an internal electricity market was passed in 1996 by the European Parliament, and another on the internal gas market two years later. The directive for the electricity market contained the requirement that network operation and energy generation should not done by a single (monopolistic) company. Having energy generation separate would allow for competition in that sector, whereas network operation would remain regulated.

=== Renewable energy and the 20/20/20 target ===
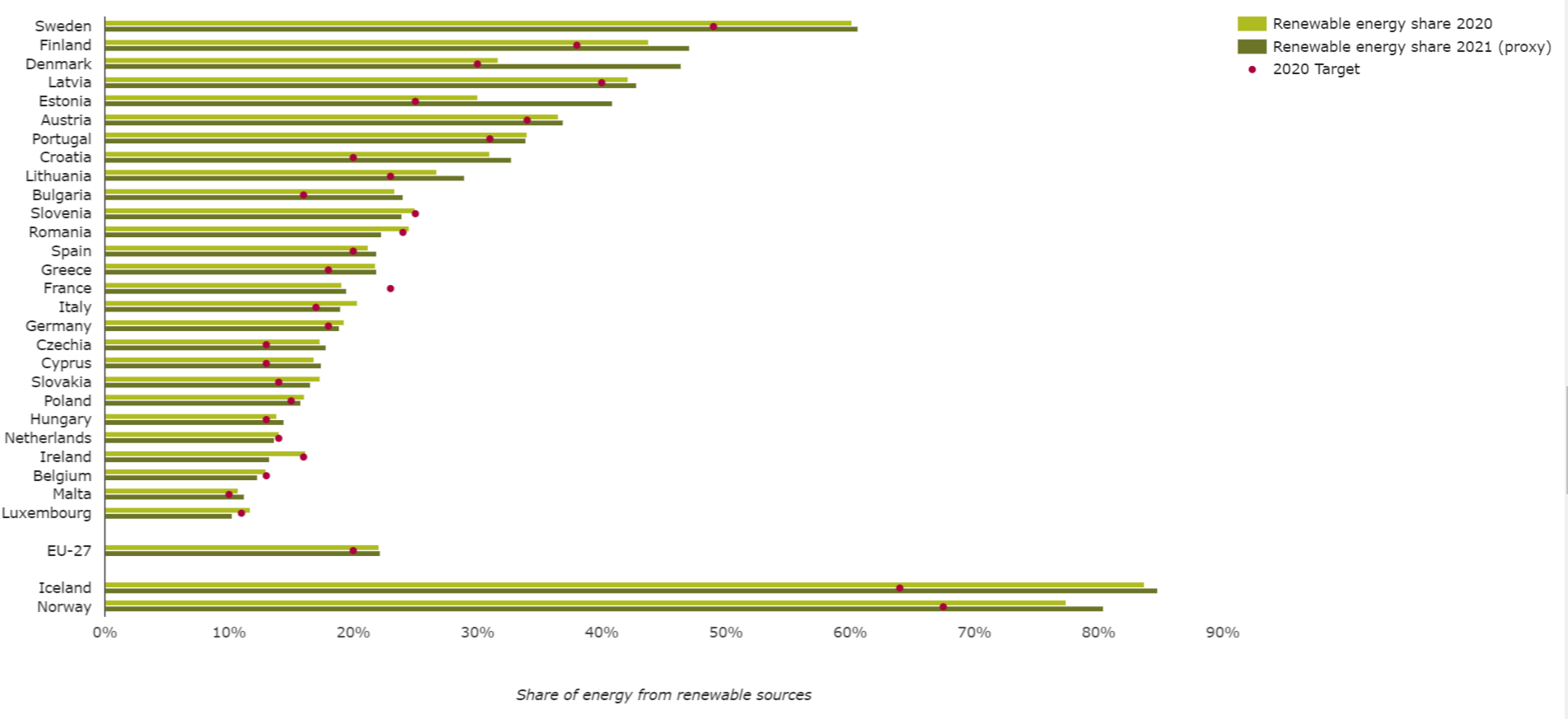
2020 and 2021 fulfillment of the 2009 Renewable Energy Directive (RED): Share of energy consumption from renewable sources for EU and EEA countries compared to the targets for 2020. EU27 plus United Kingdom pledged an average of 20 percent renewable energy for 2020, and EU27 reached 22 percent.

The share of electricity coming from renewable sources continues to vary widely among European nations. A few countries generate more electricity from renewables than is consumed in total.

In 2001, the first Renewable Energy Directive was passed, in the context of the 1997 Kyoto Protocol against climate change. It included a target of doubling the share of renewable energy in the EU's energy mix from 6% to 12% by 2010. The increase for the electricity sector was even higher, with a goal of 22%. Two years later a directive was passed which increased the share of biofuels in transport.

These directives were replaced in 2009 with the 20-20-20 targets, which sought to increase the share of renewables to 20% by 2020. Additionally, greenhouse gas emissions needed to drop by 20% compared to 1990, and energy efficiency improved by 20%. In included mandatory targets for each member state, which differed by member state. While not all national government reached their targets, overall, the EU surpassed the three targets. Greenhouse gas emissions were 34% lower in 2020 than in 1990 for instance.

=== Energy Union ===
The Energy Union Strategy is a project of the European Commission to coordinate the transformation of European energy supply. It was launched in February 2015, with the aim of providing secure, sustainable, competitive, affordable energy.

Donald Tusk, President of the European Council, introduced the idea of an energy union when he was Prime Minister of Poland. Eurocommissioner Vice President Maroš Šefčovič called the Energy Union the biggest energy project since the European Coal and Steel Community. The EU's reliance on Russia for its energy, and the annexation of Crimea by Russia have been cited as strong reasons for the importance of this policy.

The European Council concluded on 19 March 2015 that the EU is committed to building an Energy Union with a forward-looking climate policy on the basis of the commission's framework strategy, with five priority dimensions:

- Energy security, solidarity and trust
- A fully integrated European energy market
- Energy efficiency contributing to moderation of demand
- Decarbonising the economy
- Research, innovation and competitiveness.

The strategy includes a minimum 10% electricity interconnection target for all member states by 2020, which the Commission hopes will put downward pressure onto energy prices, reduce the need to build new power plants, reduce the risk of black-outs or other forms of electrical grid instability, improve the reliability of renewable energy supply, and encourage market integration.

EU Member States agreed 25 January 2018 on the commission's proposal to invest €873 million in clean energy infrastructure. The projects are financed by CEF (Connecting Europe Facility).

- €578 million for the construction of the Biscay Gulf France-Spain interconnection, a 280 km long off-shore section and a French underground land section. This new link will increase the interconnection capacity between both countries from 2.8 GW to 5 GW.
- €70 million to construct the SüdOstLink, 580 km of high-voltage cables laid fully underground. The power line will create an urgently needed link between the wind power generated in the north and the consumption centres in the south of Germany.
- €101 million for the CyprusGas2EU project to provide natural gas to Cyprus

=== European Green Deal ===
The European Green Deal, approved in 2020, is a set of policy initiatives by the European Commission with the overarching aim of making the European Union (EU) climate neutral in 2050. The plan is to review each existing law on its climate merits, and also introduce new legislation on the circular economy, building renovation, farming and innovation.

The president of the European Commission, Ursula von der Leyen, stated that the European Green Deal would be Europe's "man on the moon moment". Von der Leyen appointed Frans Timmermans as Executive Vice President of the European Commission for the European Green Deal. On 13 December 2019, the European Council decided to press ahead with the plan, with an opt-out for Poland. On 15 January 2020, the European Parliament voted to support the deal as well, with requests for higher ambition. A year later, the European Climate Law was passed, which legislated that greenhouse gas emissions should be 55% lower in 2030 compared to 1990. The Fit for 55 package is a large set of proposed legislation detailing how the European Union plans to reach this target, including major proposal for energy sectors such as renewable energy and transport.

After the Russian invasion of Ukraine, the EU launched REPowerEU to quickly reduce import dependency on Russia for oil and gas. While the policy proposal includes a substantial acceleration for renewable energy deployment, it also contains expansion of fossil fuel infrastructure from alternative suppliers.

The impact of inflation, particularly driven by surging energy prices, prompted around 35% of firms to spend between 25% and 50% more on energy in 2024, further encouraging investments aimed at reducing energy consumption. This aligns with the goals of the Green Deal, where energy efficiency improvements are seen as key to reducing both emissions and energy costs.

== Earlier proposals ==
The possible principles of Energy Policy for Europe were elaborated at the commission's green paper A European Strategy for Sustainable, Competitive and Secure Energy on 8 March 2006. As a result of the decision to develop a common energy policy, the first proposals, Energy for a Changing World were published by the European Commission, following a consultation process, on 10 January 2007.

It is claimed that they will lead to a 'post-industrial revolution', or a low-carbon economy, in the European Union, as well as increased competition in the energy markets, improved security of supply, and improved employment prospects. The commission's proposals were approved at a meeting of the European Council on 8 and 9 March 2007.

Key proposals included:

- A cut of at least 20% in greenhouse gas emissions from all primary energy sources by 2020 (compared to 1990 levels), while pushing for an international agreement to succeed the Kyoto Protocol aimed at achieving a 30% cut by all developed nations by 2020.
- A cut of up to 95% in carbon emissions from primary energy sources by 2050, compared to 1990 levels.
- A minimum target of 10% for the use of biofuels by 2020.
- That the energy supply and generation activities of energy companies should be 'unbundled' from their distribution networks to further increase market competition.
- Improving energy relations with the EU's neighbours, including Russia.
- The development of a European Strategic Energy Technology Plan to develop technologies in areas including renewable energy, energy conservation, low-energy buildings, fourth generation nuclear reactor, coal pollution mitigation, and carbon capture and sequestration (CCS).
- Developing an Africa-Europe Energy partnership, to help Africa 'leap-frog' to low-carbon technologies and to help develop the continent as a sustainable energy supplier.

Many underlying proposals are designed to limit global temperature changes to no more than 2 °C above pre-industrial levels, of which 0.8 °C has already taken place and another 0.5–0.7 °C is already committed. 2 °C is usually seen as the upper temperature limit to avoid 'dangerous global warming'. Due to only minor efforts in global Climate change mitigation it is highly likely that the world will not be able to reach this particular target. The EU might then not only be forced to accept a less ambitious global target. Because the planned emissions reductions in the European energy sector (95% by 2050) are derived directly from the 2 °C target since 2007, the EU will have to revise its energy policy paradigm.

In 2014, negotiations about binding EU energy and climate targets until 2030 are set to start. European Parliament voted in February 2014 in favour of binding 2030 targets on renewables, emissions and energy efficiency: a 40% cut in greenhouse gases, compared with 1990 levels; at least 30% of energy to come from renewable sources; and a 40% improvement in energy efficiency.

== Current policies ==
=== Energy sources ===
As a source of electric power in the EU, renewables overtook fossil fuels by 2020, and solar and wind together exceeded fossil fuels by 2025.

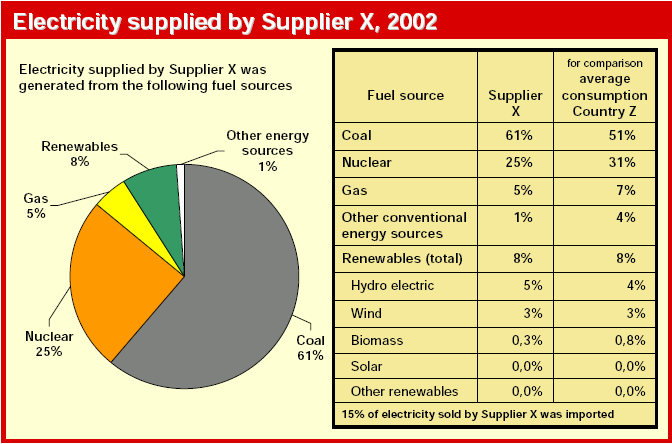
A recommended Fuel mix disclosure display format, proposed in a note annexed to the Internal Market in Electricity Directive

Home energy performance rating charts

Example EU energy label for washing machine; similars are used for buildings and vehicles

Under the requirements of the Directive on Electricity Production from Renewable Energy Sources, which entered into force in October 2001, the member states are expected to meet "indicative" targets for renewable energy production. Although there is significant variation in national targets, the average is that 22% of electricity should be generated by renewables by 2010 (compared to 13,9% in 1997). The European Commission has proposed in its Renewable Energy Roadmap21 a binding target of increasing the level of renewable energy in the EU's overall mix from less than 7% today to 20% by 2020.

Europe spent €406 billion in 2011 and €545 billion in 2012 on importing fossil fuels. This is around three times more than the cost of the Greek bailout up to 2013. In 2012, wind energy avoided €9.6 billion of fossil fuel costs. EWEA recommends binding renewable energy target to support in replacing fossil fuels with wind energy in Europe by providing a stable regulatory framework. In addition, it recommends setting a minimum emission performance standard for all new-build power installations.

For over a decade, the European Investment Bank has managed the European Local Energy Assistance (ELENA) facility on behalf of the European Commission, which provides technical assistance to any private or public entity in order to help prepare energy-efficient and renewable energy investments in buildings or innovative urban transportation projects. The EU Modernisation Fund, formed in 2018 as part of the new EU Emissions Trading System (ETS) Directive and with direct engagement from the EIB12, targets such investments as well as energy efficiency and a fair transition across 10 Member States.

The European Investment Bank took part in energy financing in Europe in 2022: a part of their REPowerEU package was to assist up to €115 billion in energy investment through 2027, in addition to regular lending operation in the sector. The European Investment Bank Group has invested about €134 billion in the energy sector of the European Union during the last ten years (2010-2020), in addition to extra funding for renewable energy projects in various countries. These initiatives are currently assisting Europe in surviving the crisis brought on by the sudden interruption of Russian gas supply.

As part of the REPowerEU Plan, the European Union has significantly decreased its reliance on Russian gas by reducing imports from 45 percent in 2021 to 15 percent in 2023, while also achieving a near 20 percent reduction in overall gas usage. By March 31, EU natural gas storage levels reached over 58 percent, the highest for this period, supported by regulatory measures that mandate storage facilities to maintain at least 90 percent capacity by November each year. These strategies are part of the EU's broader efforts to diversify energy sources and increase sustainability, aligning with investments in renewable energy and efficiency enhancements across member states.

=== Energy markets ===
The EU promotes electricity market liberalisation and security of supply through Directive 2019/944

The 2004 Gas Security Directive has been intended to improve security of supply in the natural gas sector.

=== Energy efficiency ===
Rising energy costs led to a 5.6 percentage point increase in planned investments in energy efficiency, largely driven by SMEs, increasing from 52.3% to 57.9% in 2022.

=== IPEEC ===
At the Heiligendamm Summit in June 2007, the G8 acknowledged an EU proposal for an international initiative on energy efficiency tabled in March 2007, and agreed to explore, together with the International Energy Agency, the most effective means to promote energy efficiency internationally. A year later, on 8 June 2008, the G8 countries, China, India, South Korea and the European Community decided to establish the International Partnership for Energy Efficiency Cooperation, at the Energy Ministerial meeting hosted by Japan in the frame of the 2008 G8 Presidency, in Aomori.

=== Buildings ===
Buildings account for around 40% of EU energy requirements and have been the focus of several initiatives. From 4 January 2006, the 2002 Directive on the energy performance of buildings requires member states to ensure that new buildings, as well as large existing buildings undergoing refurbishment, meet certain minimum energy requirements. It also requires that all buildings should undergo 'energy certification' prior to sale, and that boilers and air conditioning equipment should be regularly inspected.

As part of the EU's SAVE Programme, aimed at promoting energy efficiency and encouraging energy-saving behaviour, the Boiler Efficiency Directive specifies minimum levels of efficiency for boilers fired with liquid or gaseous fuels. Originally, from June 2007, all homes (and other buildings) in the UK would have to undergo Energy Performance Certification before they are sold or let, to meet the requirements of the European Energy Performance of Buildings Directive (Directive 2002/91/EC).

=== Transport ===
EU policies include the voluntary ACEA agreement, signed in 1998, to cut carbon dioxide emissions for new cars sold in Europe to an average of 140 grams of CO_{2}/km by 2008, a 25% cut from the 1995 level. Because the target was unlikely to be met, the European Commission published new proposals in February 2007, requiring a mandatory limit of 130 grams of CO_{2}/km for new cars by 2012, with 'complementary measures' being proposed to achieve the target of 120 grams of CO_{2}/km that had originally been expected.

In the area of fuels, the 2001 Biofuels Directive requires that 5,75% of all transport fossil fuels (petrol and diesel) should be replaced by biofuels by 31 December 2010, with an intermediate target of 2% by the end of 2005. In February 2007 the European Commission proposed that, from 2011, suppliers will have to reduce carbon emissions per unit of energy by 1% a year from 2010 levels, to result in a cut of 10% by 2020 Stricter fuel standards to combat climate change and reduce air pollution.

Eurostat reported on 22 September 2026 that fuel and lubricant prices for personal transport in the European Union increased by 23.8% in August 2026 compared with August 2025. On a month-on-month basis, diesel prices rose by 8.3% and petrol prices by 3.3% in August 2026 relative to July. Between July and August 2026, diesel prices increased in 26 of the 27 EU member states.

==== Flights ====
Airlines can be charged for their greenhouse gas emissions on flights to and from Europe according to a court ruling in October 2011.

Historically, EU aviation fuel was tax free and applied no VAT. Fuel taxation in the EU was banned in 2003 under the Energy Taxation Directive, except for domestic flights and on intra-EU flights on the basis of bilateral agreements. No such agreements exist.

In 2018 Germany applied 19% VAT on domestic airline tickets. Many other member states had 0% VAT. Unlike air travel, VAT is applied to bus and rail, which creates economic distortions, increasing demand for air travel relative to other forms of transport. This increases aviation emissions and constitutes a state aid subsidy. In 2018, Transport & Environment estimated that taxing aviation fuel for domestic and intra-EU flights at the EU minimum rate of 33 cents per litre could generate about €9.5 billion in annual revenue, and that applying a 15% VAT to passenger transport could generate a further €17 billion.

=== Industry ===
The European Union Emissions Trading Scheme, introduced in 2005 under the 2003 Emission Trading Directive, sets member state-level caps on greenhouse gas emissions for power plants and other large point sources.

=== Consumer goods ===
A further area of energy policy has been in the area of consumer goods, where energy labels were introduced to encourage consumers to purchase more energy-efficient appliances.

=== External energy relations ===
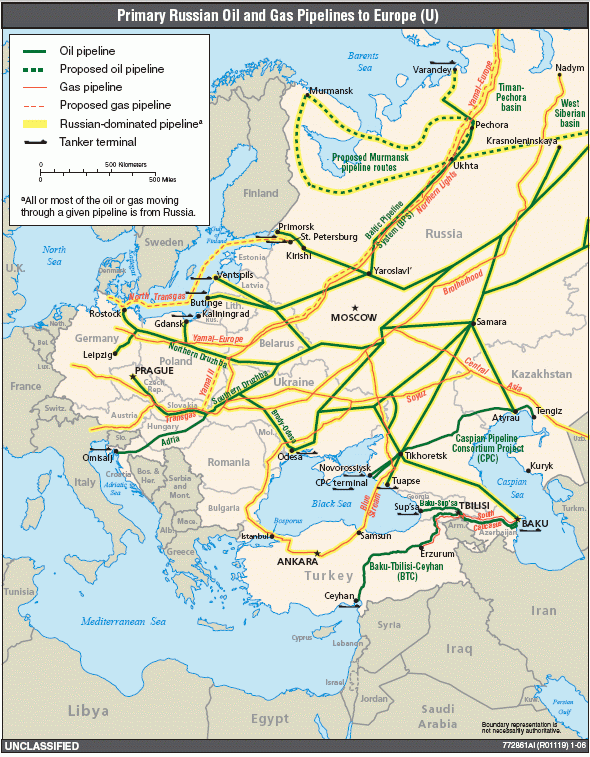
Many EU members import oil and gas from Russia.

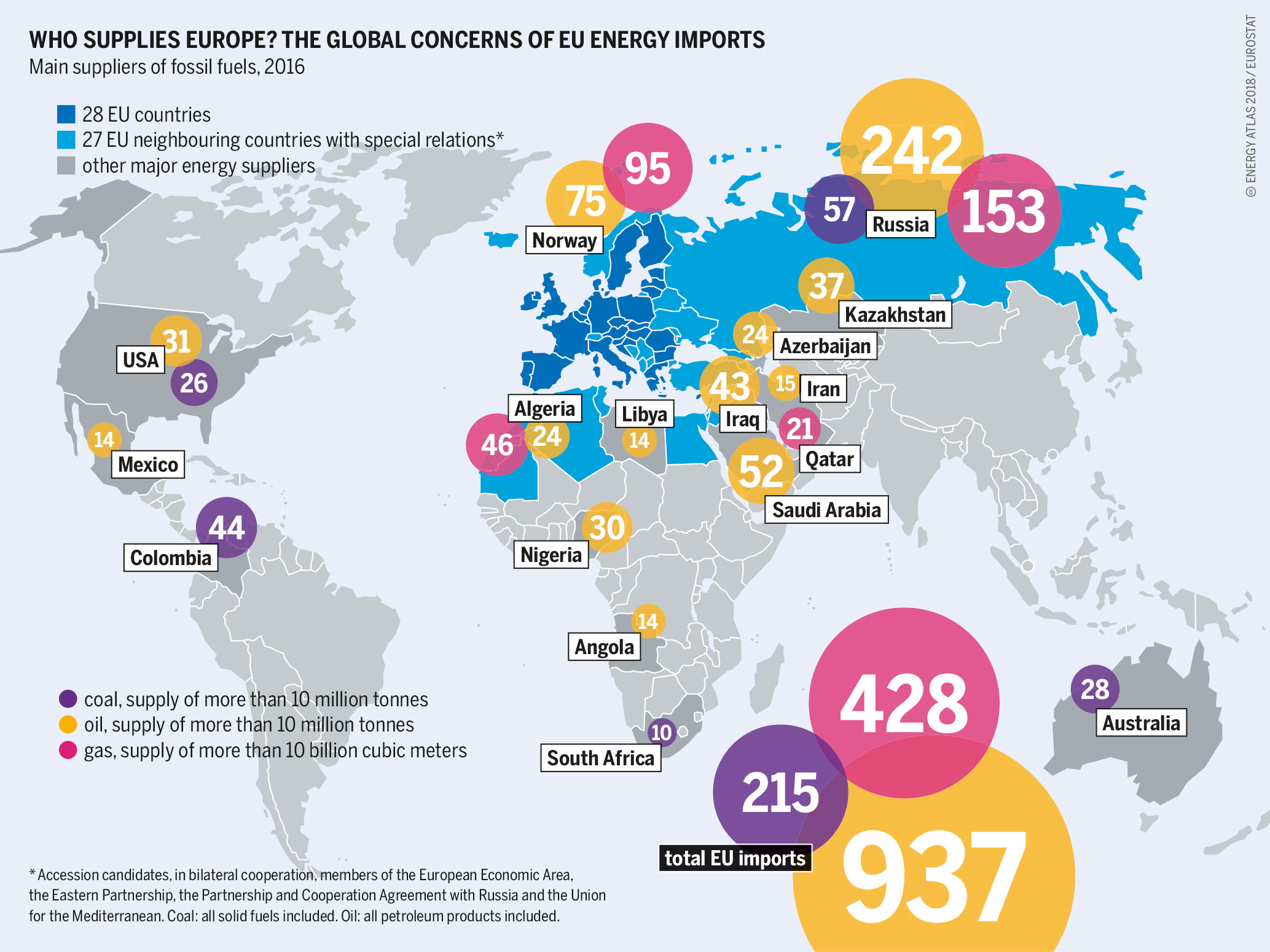
Who supplies Europe? The global concerns of EU energy imports

Beyond the bounds of the European Union, EU energy policy has included negotiating and developing wider international agreements, such as the Energy Charter Treaty, the Kyoto Protocol, the post-Kyoto regime and a framework agreement on energy efficiency; extension of the EC energy regulatory framework or principles to neighbours (Energy Community, Baku Initiative, Euro-Med energy cooperation) and the emission trading scheme to global partners; the promotion of research and the use of renewable energy.

The EU-Russia energy cooperation will be based on a new comprehensive framework agreement within the post-Partnership and Cooperation Agreement (PCA), which will be negotiated in 2007. The energy cooperation with other third energy producer and transit countries is facilitated with different tools, such as the PCAs, the existing and foreseen Memorandums of Understanding on Energy Cooperation (with Ukraine, Azerbaijan, Kazakhstan and Algeria), the Association Agreements with Mediterranean countries, the European Neighbourhood Policy Action Plans; Euromed energy cooperation; the Baku initiative; and the EU-Norway energy dialogue. For the cooperation with African countries, a comprehensive Africa-Europe Energy partnership would be launched at the highest level, with the integration of Europe's Energy and Development Policies.

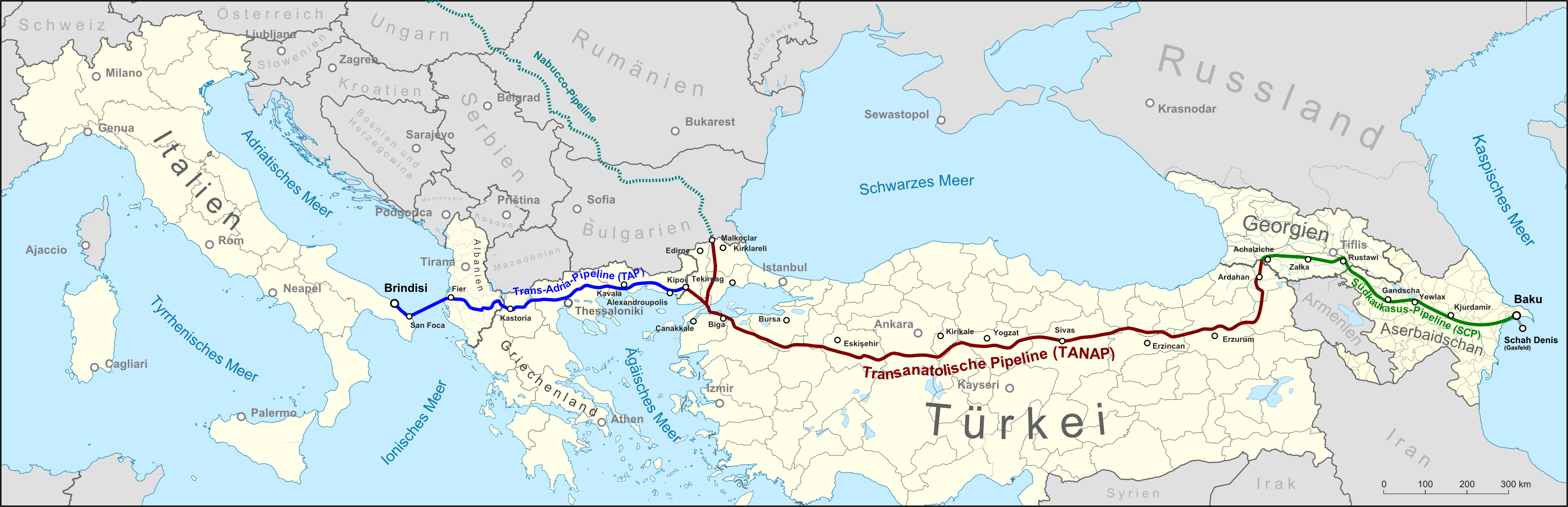
The Southern Gas Corridor, which connects the giant Shah Deniz gas field in Azerbaijan to Europe

For ensuring efficient follow-up and coherence in pursuing the initiatives and processes, for sharing information in case of an external energy crisis, and for assisting the EU's early response and reactions in case of energy security threats, the network of energy correspondents in the Member States was established in early 2007. After the Russian-Ukrainian Gas Crisis of 2009 the EU decided that the existing external measures regarding gas supply security should be supplemented by internal provisions for emergency prevention and response, such as enhancing gas storage and network capacity or the development of the technical prerequisites for reverse flow in transit pipelines.

=== Just Transition Fund ===
Just Transition Fund (JTF) was created in 2020 to boost investments in low-carbon energy. The fund was criticized for blanket ban on low-carbon nuclear power but also introduction of a loophole for fossil gas. Having the largest workforce dedicated to the coal industry, Poland—followed by Germany and Romania—is the fund's largest receptor. Amounting to €17.5 billion, the fund was approved by the European Parliament in May 2021.

=== Hydrogen economy ===
Green hydrogen is a significant component of the European Union's strategy to transition to sustainable energy and reduce carbon emissions. The European Commission has set a goal to produce 10 million tons of clean hydrogen annually within the EU by 2030. Additionally, the EU plans to import another 10 million tons per year from countries with cost-effective renewable electricity. However, some experts estimate that actual production in the EU might reach around 1 million tons per year by 2030.

The EU mandates the use of 3 million tons of hydrogen per year for the transport and maritime sectors. Challenges to achieving higher production levels include high costs and limited subsidies. In 2024, the European Hydrogen Bank announced a second auction with a budget of €1.2 billion, which is less than the initially proposed €3 billion. While there has been early interest, there is some hesitation regarding the signing of offtake contracts. Priority sectors for the use of green hydrogen include green steel production and ammonia. In contrast, sectors such as passenger road transport and home heating are given lower priority. The cost of producing green hydrogen ranges from $6 to $15 per kilogram. A subsidy model similar to that of the United States, which offers $3 per kilogram, would require €3 billion annually to support the production of 1 million tons of green hydrogen. Strategic recommendations suggest prioritizing the use of renewable electricity for displacing coal, powering electric vehicles, and operating heat pumps and green steel production before using it for green hydrogen production.

=== Methane emissions ===
Europe's share of global methane emissions in 2002.

The EU Methane Regulation (EU/2024/1787) is the European Union's first binding law on reducing methane emissions in the energy sector. It aims to reduce methane emissions into the atmosphere from the oil, gas and coal sectors, both in the EU and its global supply chains. Reducing emissions of methane, a potent greenhouse gas whose global warming potential is 82.5 times that of carbon dioxide on a 20-year timescale, is deemed crucial for achieving the EU’s climate goals and the objectives of the Global Methane Pledge. Set out in the EU Methane Strategy (COM/2020/663), the EU Methane Regulation entered into force on 4 August 2024, with most of its provisions being phased in over the following years.

== Solar anti-dumping levies ==
In 2013, a two-year investigation by the European Commission concluded that Chinese solar panel exporters were selling their products in the EU up to 88% below market prices, backed by state subsidies. In response, the European Council imposed tariffs on solar imported from China at an average rate of 47.6% beginning 6 June that year.

The Commission reviewed these measures in December 2016 and proposed to extend them for two years until March 2019. However, in January 2017, 18 out of 28 EU member states voted in favour of shortening the extension period. In February 2017, the commission announced its intention to extend its anti-dumping measures for a reduced period of 18 months.

== Research and development ==
The European Union is active in the areas of energy research, development and promotion, via initiatives such as CEPHEUS (ultra-low energy housing), and programs under the umbrella titles of SAVE (energy saving) ALTENER (new and renewable energy sources), STEER (transport) and COOPENER (developing countries). Through Fusion for Energy, the EU is participating in the ITER project.

=== SET Plan ===
The Seventh Framework Programme research program that run until 2013 only reserved a moderate amount of funding for energy research, although energy did emerge as one of the key issues of the European Union. A large part of FP7 energy funding was devoted to fusion research, a technology that will not be able to help meet European climate and energy objectives until beyond 2050. The European Commission tried to redress this shortfall with the SET plan.

The SET plan initiatives included a European Wind Initiative, the Solar Europe Initiative, the Bioenergy Europe Initiative, the European electricity grid initiative and an initiative for sustainable nuclear fission. The budget for the SET plan is estimated at €71.5 billion. The IEA raised its concern that demand-side technologies do not feature at all in the six priority areas of the SET Plan.

== Public opinion ==
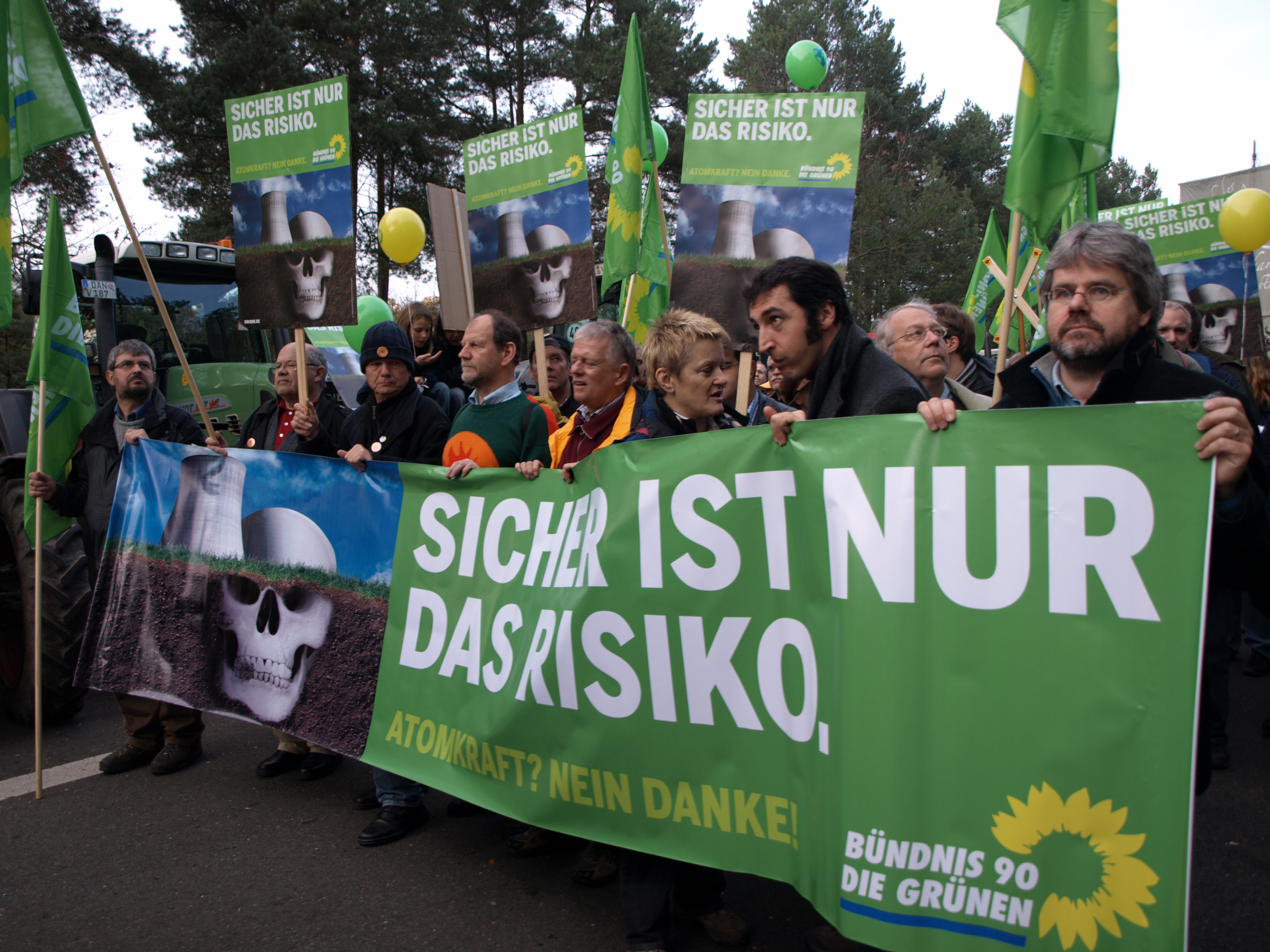
Anti-nuclear protest near nuclear waste disposal centre at Gorleben in northern Germany

In a poll carried out for the European Commission in October and November 2005, 47% of the citizens questioned in the 27 countries of the EU (including the 2 states that joined in 2007) were in favour of taking decisions on key energy policy issues at a European level. 37% favoured national decisions and 8% that they be tackled locally.

A similar survey of 29,220 people in March and May 2006 indicated that the balance had changed in favour of national decisions in these areas (42% in favour), with 39% backing EU policy making and 12% preferring local decisions. There was significant national variation with this, with 55% in favour of European level decision making in the Netherlands, but only 15% in Finland.

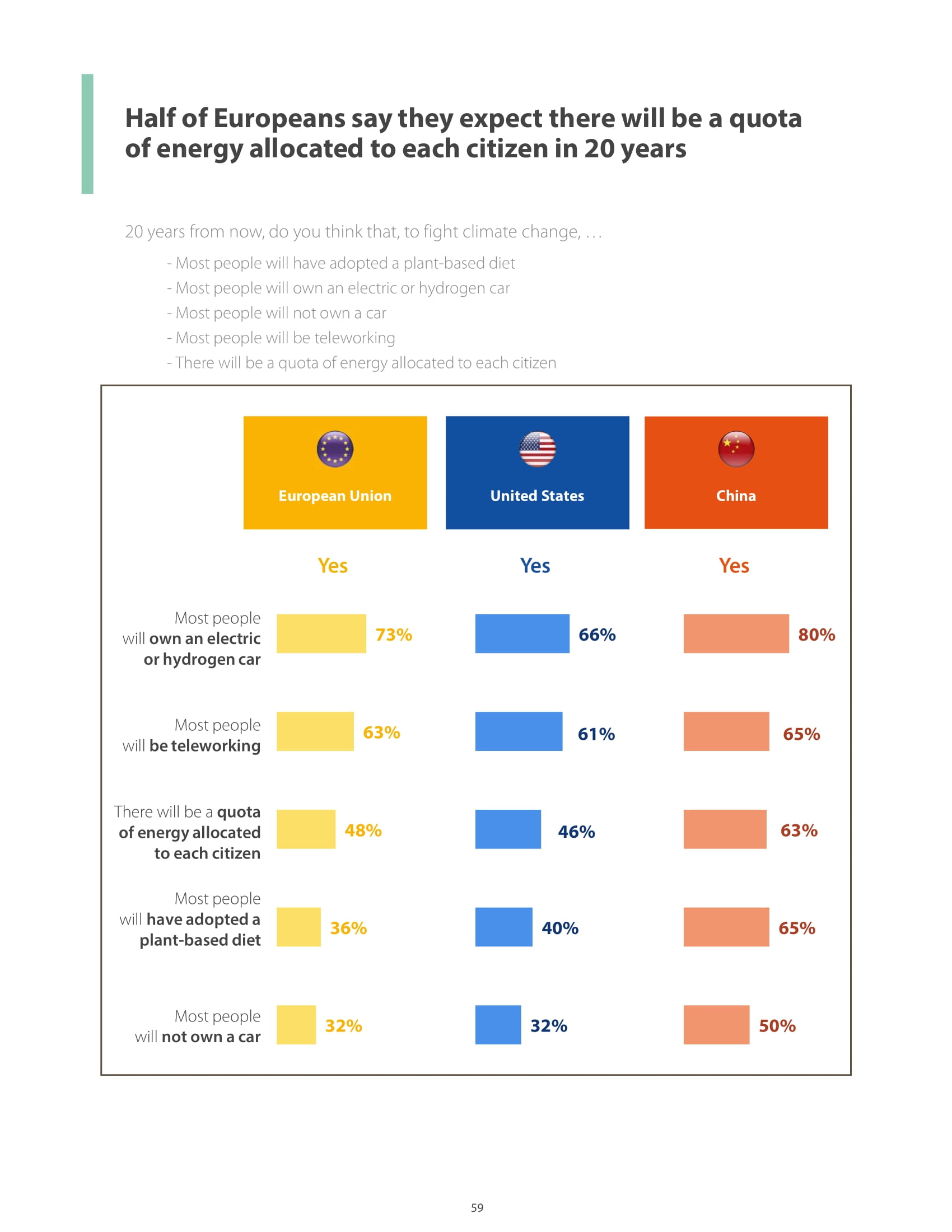
Half of European respondents to a survey on climate say they expect there will be a quota of energy allocated to each citizen in 20 years.

A comprehensive public opinion survey was performed in May and June 2006. The authors propose following conclusions:

- Energy issues are considered to be important but not at first glance.
- EU citizens perceive great future promise in the use of renewable energies. Despite majority opposition, nuclear energy also has its place in the future energy mix.
- Citizens appear to opt for changing the energy structure, enhancing research and development and guaranteeing the stability of the energy field rather than saving energy as the way to meet energy challenges.
- The possible future consequences of energy issues do not generate deep fears in Europeans' minds.
- Europeans appear to be fairly familiar with energy issues, although their knowledge seems somewhat vague.
- Energy issues touch everybody and it is therefore hard to distinguish clear groups with differing perceptions. Nevertheless, rough distinction between groups of citizens is sketched.

== Example European countries ==
=== Germany ===
In September 2010, the German government adopted a set of ambitious goals to transform their national energy system and to reduce national greenhouse gas emissions by 80 to 95% by 2050 (relative to 1990). This transformation became known as the Energiewende. Subsequently, the government decided to the phase-out the nation's fleet of nuclear reactors, to be complete by 2022. As of 2014, the country is making steady progress on this transition.

== See also ==
- CHP Directive
- Directorate-General for Energy
- Energy Charter Treaty
- Energy Community
- Energy diplomacy
- Energy in Europe
- EU Energy Efficiency Directive 2012
- European Climate Change Programme
- European Commissioner for Energy
- European countries by electricity consumption per person
- European countries by fossil fuel use (% of total energy)
- European Ecodesign Directive
- European Pollutant Emission Register (EPER)
- European Union energy label
- Global strategic petroleum reserves
- Internal Market in Electricity Directive
- INOGATE
- List of electricity interconnection level
- Renewable energy in the European Union
- Special economic zone
- Transport in Europe
