= Sabah Al Kheir Ya Arab =

- Genre: Morning television Infotainment Variety
- Created by: MBC Group
- Developed by: MBC Group
- Starring: Hani Al-Hamed, Huda Al-Khuraif, Khalil Al-Fahd, Sara Murad, Suha Nuwailaty
- Country of origin: Saudi Arabia
- Original language: Arabic

Production
- Producer: MBC Group
- Production location: MBC studios in Dubai
- Running time: 1 hour 40 minutes
- Production company: MBC Group

Original release
- Network: MBC 1

Sabah Al Kheir Ya Arab, The morning show صباح الخير يا عرب (Good Morning Arabs) is an Arabic-language morning television show that broadcasts on MBC1 satellite which is available without subscription channel which is operated by MBC Group. The program showcases a hybrid of news coverage, wellness, and lifestyle content, entertainment, health guidance, fashion, travel-related segments, and interviews. The show is directed towards a typical Arab family audience across the Middle East and North Africa (MENA), and it usually aligns with a magazine style format standard for morning television programs.

== Overview ==
The show صباح الخير يا عرب (Good Morning Arabs) was made to be an infotainment segment that would showcase various subjects. The content that would usually be presented balances between informational episodes alongside light hearted entertainment that would provide relevant practical and cultural insights for viewers to watch in the morning. The television program is part of MBC1’s morning time programs that reflects the networks orientation towards wide family oriented audiences.

== History ==
The exact date when صباح الخير يا عرب (Good Morning Arabs) first launched was never specified by MBC Group formally. However, there were archived interviews of the program that were uploaded on YouTube on June 19, 2012, which indicated that the show was first broadcast in mid 2012. Ever since, the show has been continuously airing as part of MBC1's fixed schedule.

== Broadcast and availability ==
The production airs on MBC1, is one of the most broadly viewed Arab television networks across the region. Some curated excerpts and episodes are available to watch on Shahid, which is one of MBC Group's authorized streaming platform, which provides on-demand access to the show for watchers all over the Arab world and worldwide.

== Production ==
صباح الخير يا عرب (Good Morning Arabs) is a show that is produced by MBC Group which is a dominant commercial media institute that operates various television broadcasting channels across the Middle East and North Africa (MENA). The organization manages its programming via internal production departments, with the show included as part of its regularly produced television programs.

=== Filming location ===
The show was filmed and remains in productions in the MBC Studios. The production studio of MBC Group is equipped with industry-standard production infrastructure for scripted and unscripted television production in the Gulf region. The studio setting was designed to support presenter led discussions, interviews, and ongoing segments.

=== Presenters and segments ===
The series was presented by a rotating lineup of presenters which include Hani Alhamed, Huda Alkhuraif, Khalil Alfahad, Sara Murad, and Suha Nuwailaty. The program is structured according to established recurring segments that are oriented towards daily household life, culinary practices, topics related to women interests, personal development stories, social ettiqutte, and family guidance.

== Advertising and sponsorship ==
As a part of a commercial broadcasting system, صباح الخير يا عرب (Good Morning Arabs) operates within a free to air television model which include advertising interruptions and sponsored segments. Some selected segments in particular travel or special feature editions incorporate sponsorships from tourism authorities and commercial organizations, which in turn support the production team to make longer segments and special episodes.

== Audience ==
The program targets Arabic-speaking individuals throughout the Middle East and North Africa (MENA), it particular in focuses on adults and families engaged in Morning Television Shows. It is formally incorporated into MBC1’s programming schedule, the show benefits from significant regional exposure. Media reports related to travel concentrated segments show that صباح الخير يا عرب (Good Morning Arabs) has an estimated reach of 40 million viewers across the Middle East and North Africa, which reflects its broad appeal.

== Global and localized media practices ==
Sabah Al Kheir Ya Arab follows a global morning show format mixing news, interviews, and pop culture-related content. MBC Group has not stated that Sabah Al Kheir Ya Arab was inspired by western programs like Good Morning America and BBC Breakfast.

Global media practices installed in Good Morning Arabs are interview-style schedule, segmented formats, and professional studio production all localized through Arabic-language presentation and tailoring the news to fit regional, cultural, and social context.
