= European Technology Platform for Sustainable Chemistry =

The European Technology Platform for Sustainable Chemistry (SusChem) is a European Technology Platform (ETP) initiative to improve the competitive situation of the European Union in the field of chemistry in three domains: Industrial Biotechnology, Materials Technology, and Reaction and Process Design.

The programme is a joint initiative (Public-Private Partnership) of the European Commission, representing the European Communities, and the industry. The main objective of the programma is to produce and implement a Strategic Research Agenda (SRA).

== See also ==
- European Technology Platform
- Joint Technology Initiative
