= European Steel Technology Platform =

The European Steel Technology Platform (ESTEP) is a European Seventh Framework Programme initiative to improve the competitive situation of the European Union in the field of steel technology. The main objective of the programme is to produce a Strategic Research Agenda (SRA).

The programme is a joint initiative (Public-Private Partnership) of the European Commission, representing the European Communities, and the industry. The ESTEP was launched in March 2004 by European Research Commissioner Philippe Busquin and Guy Dollé, Chief Executive Officer of Arcelor and President of EUROFER.

== See also ==
- European Technology Platform
- Joint Technology Initiative
