= Fuel mix disclosure =

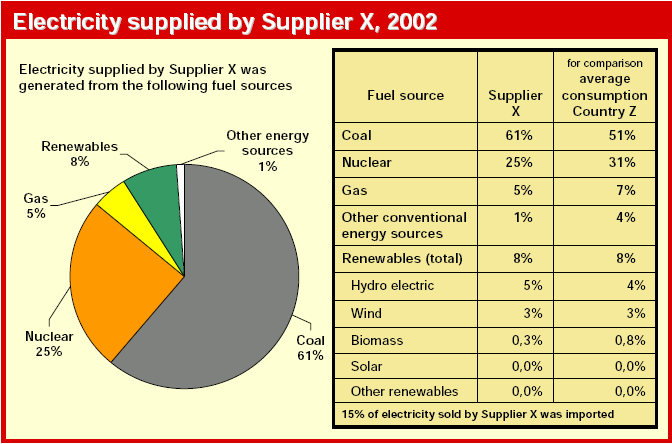
Recommended fuel mix display format, EU, 2003

According to the European Union's Internal Market in Electricity Directive from July 1, 2004, electric power consumers must be informed about the sources from which the electricity they have purchased was generated. Additionally, consumers must be informed about the amount of carbon dioxide emitted into the Earth's atmosphere and/or the quantity of nuclear waste produced as a result of the generation of the electricity that they have purchased.

The exact presentation of the data provided, be that in tables or charts, and the number of types of electricity generation listed are at the discretion of the EU Member States.

Fuel mix disclosure aims to allow customers to differentiate between electricity supply companies and switch supplier as part of the wider programme of EU electricity liberalization.

== See also ==
- Energy policy of the European Union
- Renewable energy economy
