= ICFO =

Photonic sciences research institute in Spain

ICFO - The Institute of Photonic Sciences
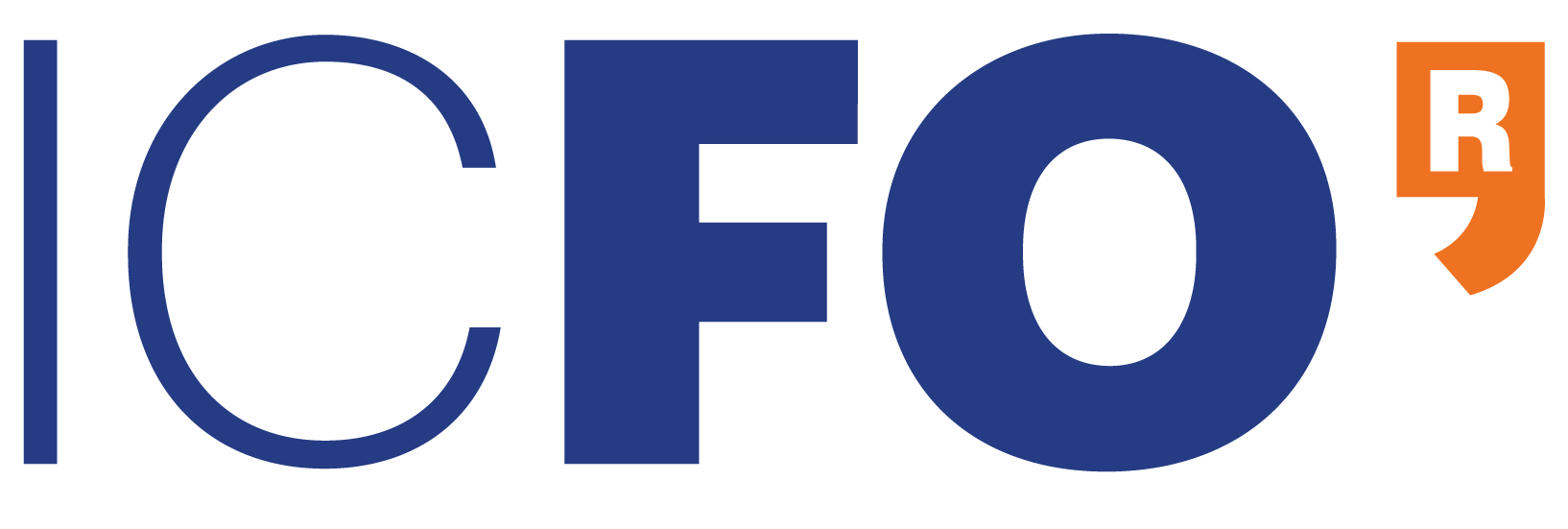

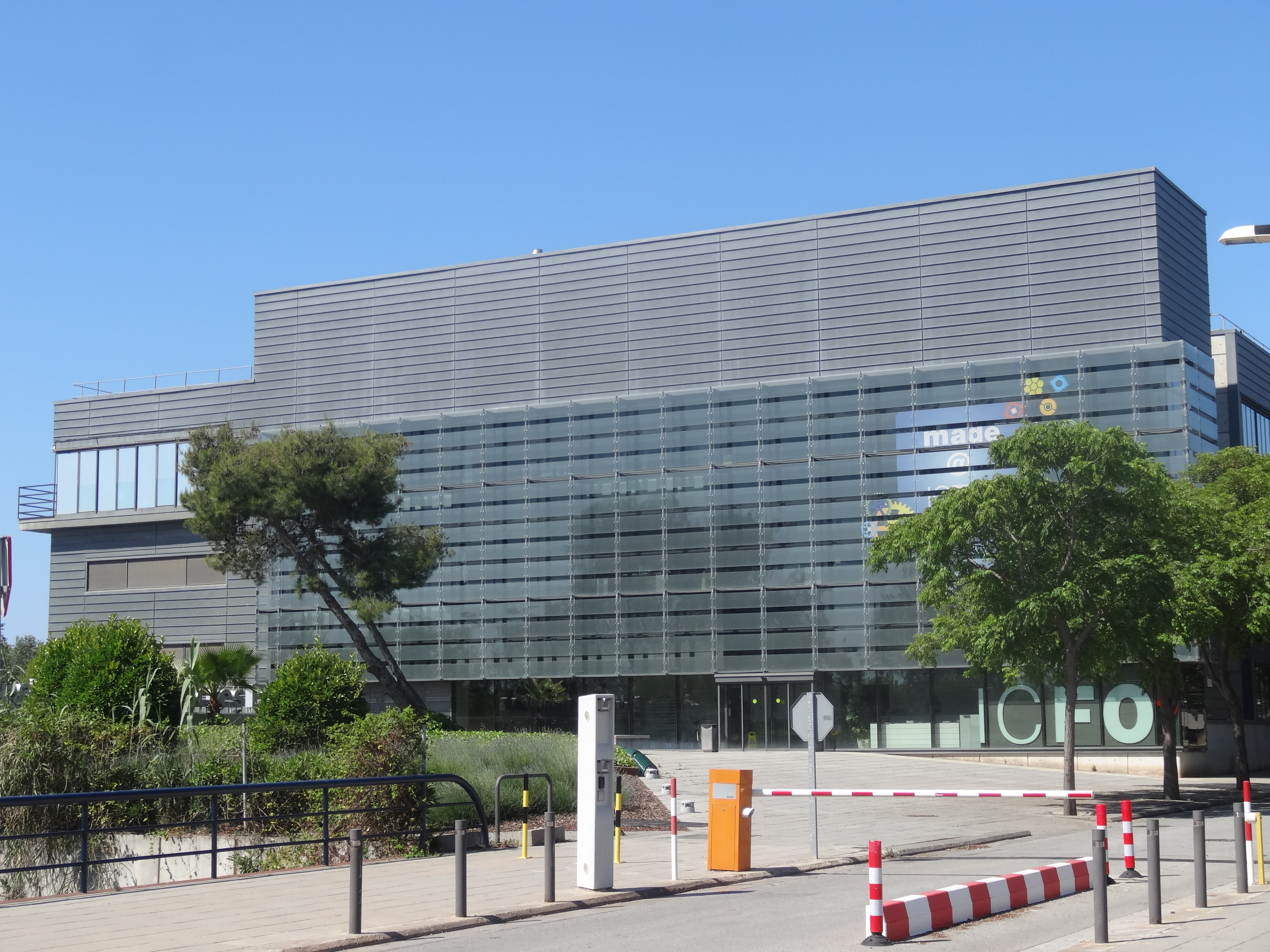
- Established: 2002
- Research type: basic and applied
- Field of research: Photonics, Quantum technology, Graphene
- Director: Oriol Romero-Isart
- Staff: 400
- Location: Castelldefels, Barcelona, Spain
- Website: https://www.icfo.eu/

ICFO – The Institute of Photonic Sciences (in Catalan: Institut de Ciències Fotòniques, in Spanish: Instituto de Ciencias Fotónicas) is a research center devoted to the science and technology of light. Located in Castelldefels (Barcelona, Spain), ICFO was created in 2002 by the Government of Catalonia and the Technical University of Catalonia.

The Institute is a research center that covers various fields of physics and optics, from theoretical to applied aspects. It also provides education and training for new scientists and technologists. The institute has more than 400 researchers in 26 research groups, who work in over 60 laboratories. The institute has several facilities that support its research activities, such as a Nanophotonics Fabrication lab, a Super-Resolution Light Microscopy & Nanoscopy Lab, and an Advanced Engineering Lab.

== Research ==
Research at ICFO encompasses four broad thematic areas: nonlinear photonics, quantum photonics, nanophotonics, and biophotonics. Researchers work in a variety of fields, including quantum information technologies, nanophotonic devices, remote sensors, optoelectronics, integrated optics, ultrafast optics, biophotonics, and biomedical optics. Projects are run as part of both medium-term and long-term programs.

== Research areas ==
The research at ICFO focuses on the science and technology based on light for applications in health, renewable energy, and information technologies.

=== Health ===
The Super-resolution Light Microscopy & Nanoscopy (SLN) facility at ICFO is a Euro‐BioImaging (EuBI) specialized imaging facility node, providing biological and medical imaging services for life scientists world-wide. Available techniques include super resolution STORM and STED, Lattice light sheet, Light sheet fluorescence, Raman and SERS, Fluorescence (Confocal, Multispectral Confocal, FRET, FRAP, etc.), Multiphoton (TPEF, THG, SHG), Optical Tweezers and Femtosecond nanosurgery. ICFO's SLN facility is part of the European CORBEL and LaserLab research infrastructures.

Research is being conducted in the field of medical optics, and several programs and initiatives have been established with local hospitals, healthcare centers, biomedical research centers, universities, among others to integrate photonic based technologies in healthcare services.

=== Energy ===
Photonics is at the core of light-harvesting concepts and technologies like photovoltaics and solar cells. To tackle the challenges in energy efficiency, researchers at ICFO are developing new approaches to renewable energy applications. Examples of on-going projects include low-cost highly efficient transparent solar cells, organic LEDs, transparent photonic devices, smart windows, energy efficient optoelectronic devices, photoelectric, thermoelectric and electromechanical transducers, and energy efficient sensors. The center also performs research in nanophotonics, such as nano-structured materials, nano-cavities, nano-antennas, and nano-photonic devices.

=== Information ===
ICFO conducts experimental and theoretical research in classical and quantum communication systems, developing new photonic materials and quantum technologies.

== Education ==
ICFO participates in local and international Master and PhD Programs:

1. Master in Photonics (MSc) offered by UPC (Universitat Politècnica de Catalunya); UAB (Universitat Autònoma de Barcelona); UB (Universitat de Barcelona); and ICFO.
2. Erasmus Mundus Master Course (EMMC) EUROPHOTONICS.
3. PhD Program offered by UPC (Universitat Politècnica de Catalunya) and ICFO.
4. Erasmus Mundus Joint Doctorate in Photonics Engineering, Nanophotonics and Biophotonics.

== Industrial collaborations and spin-offs companies ==
ICFO maintains a range of industrial collaborations and has to date helped to generate six spin-off companies: Radiantis (2005), Cosingo- Imagine Optics Spain S.L. (2008), Signadyne (now part of Keysight Technologies (2011), ProCareLight (2013), HemoPhotonics (2013), and QuSide (2017).

The institute is member of the European Photonics Industry Consortium and takes part in the European Technology Platforms Photonics21 (cf. its national equivalent Fotónica21) and ETP Nanomedicine. It participates in the Southern European cluster in Photonics and Optic SECPhO.

== Awards ==
In 2021, ICFO received the Optica Diversity & Inclusion Advocacy Recognition for "their deliberate and intentional work to integrate equitable, transparent and inclusive policies and programs throughout their institution’s hiring, mentoring and programmatic programming."
