= European Technology Platform on Smart Systems Integration =

The European Technology Platform on Smart Systems Integration (EPoSS) is a European Framework Programmes for Research and Technological Development initiative to improve the competitive situation of the European Union in the field of Smart Systems Technologies and integrated Micro and Nanosystems.

The programme is a joint initiative (Public-Private Partnership) of the European Commission, representing the European Communities, and the industry.

EPoSS, the European Technology Platform on Smart Systems Integration, is an industry-driven policy initiative, defining R&D and innovation needs as well as policy requirements related to Smart Systems Integration and integrated Micro- and Nanosystems.

EPoSS is an international non-profit association according to German law. The EPoSS Association was founded on 18 September 2013. Its structure consists of Board, General Assembly, Executive Committee, Working Groups and Task Forces, Honorary Board and Office.

EPoSS aims to:

- provide a common European approach on Innovative Smart Systems Integration from research to production, outlining the key issues for a strategic European innovation process,
- define priorities for common research and innovation in the future,
- formulate commonly agreed road maps for action (updating, assembling and completing existing material and approaches) and provide a strategic R&D agenda, and
- mobilise public and private human, infrastructural and financial resources.

The initiative is of immediate importance in view of defining research and technology priorities for the EU Framework Programme for Research and Innovation, for raising more critical mass as well as resources and for coordinating different initiatives (national, regional, EUREKA, European public funding and industry).

== See also ==
- European Technology Platform
- Joint Technology Initiative
