= European Space Technology Platform =

The European Space Technology Platform (ESTP) is a European Seventh Framework Programme initiative to improve the competitive situation of the European Union in the field of space technology. It continues to work during Horizon 2020 (2014–2020).

The programme is a joint initiative (Public-Private Partnership) of the European Commission, representing the European Communities, and the industry. The main objective of the ESTP was to produce a Strategic Research Agenda which European Space Agency wrote for the platform.

== See also ==
- European Space Agency (ESA)
- European Technology Platform
- Galileo positioning system
- Global Monitoring for Environment and Security – the new name of the system since 2013 is "Copernicus"
