= European Construction Technology Platform =

Initiative by the European Commission

The European Construction Technology Platform (ETCP) is a European Seventh Framework Programme initiative to improve the competitive situation of the European Union in the field of construction.

The programme is a joint initiative (Public-Private Partnership) of the European Commission, representing the European Communities, and the industry. The main objective of the program is to produce a Strategic Research Agenda. The initiative was launched on 12 July 2004.

== See also ==
- European Technology Platform
