= Liberalize =

Liberalize may refer to:

- Liberalism, a political philosophy or worldview founded on ideas of liberty and equality
- Liberalization, relaxation of government restrictions, usually in areas of social, political and economic policy
