= Microeconomic reform =

Reforms aimed to increase the efficiency of an economy

Microeconomic reform (or often just economic reform) comprises policies directed to achieve improvements in economic efficiency, either by eliminating or reducing distortions in individual sectors of the economy or by reforming economy-wide policies such as tax policy and competition policy with an emphasis on economic efficiency, rather than other goals such as equity or employment growth.

"Economic reform" usually refers to deregulation, or at times to reduction in the size of government, to remove distortions caused by regulations or the presence of government, rather than new or increased regulations or government programs to reduce distortions caused by market failure. As such, these reform policies are in the tradition of laissez faire, emphasizing the distortions caused by government, rather than in ordoliberalism, which emphasizes the need for state regulation to maximize efficiency.

== Microeconomic reform in Australia ==
Microeconomic reform dominated Australian economic policy from the early 1980s until the end of the 20th century. The beginning of microeconomic reform is commonly dated to the floating of the Australian dollar in 1983. The last major policy initiatives associated with the microeconomic reform agenda was the package of tax reforms centered on the Goods and Services Tax (GST) which came into force in July 2000, and the privatization of Telstra which began in 1998 and was completed in 2006.

There were, however, some instances of microeconomic reform before the 1980s, notably including the Whitlam government’s 25 percent tariff cut. Similarly, the consequences of some microeconomic reforms initiated in the 1990s, such as National Competition Policy are still being worked through.

The policy agenda associated with microeconomic reform included:

- reductions in and eventual removal of tariff protection
- corporatisation and privatisation of government business enterprises
- deregulation of industries including airlines
- new forms of regulation in industries subject to privatisation and corporatisation
- tax reform

== Microeconomic reform in the People's Republic of China ==
The reform and opening up (simplified Chinese: 改革开放; traditional Chinese: 改革開放; pinyin: Gǎigé kāifàng) refers to the program of economic changes called "Socialism with Chinese characteristics" in the People's Republic of China (PRC) that were started in 1978 by pragmatists within the Chinese Communist Party (CCP) led by Deng Xiaoping and are ongoing as of the early 21st century. The goal of THE reform and opening up was to generate sufficient surplus value to finance the modernization of the mainland Chinese economy. Neither the socialist command economy, favored by CCP conservatives, nor the Maoist attempt at a Great Leap Forward from socialism to communism in China's agriculture (with the commune system) had generated sufficient surplus value for these purposes. The initial challenge of economic reform was to solve the problems of motivating workers and farmers to produce a larger surplus and to eliminate economic imbalances that were common in command economies. Economic reforms started since 1978 have helped lift millions of people out of poverty, bringing the poverty rate down from 53% of the population in 1981 to 8% by 2001.

== Microeconomic reform in India ==
The economic liberalization of 1991, initiated by then Indian prime minister P. V. Narasimha Rao and his finance minister Manmohan Singh, did away with investment, industrial and import licensing and ended many public monopolies, allowing automatic approval of foreign direct investment in many sectors. Since then, the overall direction of liberalization has remained the same, irrespective of the ruling party, although no party has yet tried to take on powerful lobbies such as the trade unions and farmers, or contentious issues such as reforming labor laws and reducing agricultural subsidies.

The effect of these reforms has been positive, and since 1990, India has had high growth rates and has emerged as one of the wealthiest economies in the developing world. During this period, the economy has grown constantly with only a few major setbacks. This has been accompanied by increases in life expectancy, literacy rates, and food security since then.

== Economic reform in New Zealand ==
After the snap election of 1984 in New Zealand, the new Finance Minister, Roger Douglas, began a speedy reform of the New Zealand economy. The speed of the reforms can be partially attributed to the currency crisis that resulted from the former government's refusal to devalue the New Zealand dollar.

The policies included cutting subsidies and trade barriers, privatising public assets and the control of inflation through measures rooted in monetarism. These policies were regarded in some quarters of Douglas's New Zealand Labour Party as a betrayal of traditional Labour ideals. The Labour Party subsequently retreated from these policies, but it became the core doctrine of the New Zealand ACT party.

The reforms created a very business-friendly regulatory framework. A 2008 study ranked New Zealand 99.9% in "business freedom", and 80% overall in "economic freedom", noting amongst other things that it only takes 12 days to establish a business in New Zealand on average, compared with a worldwide average of 43 days. Other indicators measured were property rights, labor market conditions, government controls and corruption, the last being considered "next to non-existent" in The Heritage Foundation and Wall Street Journal study.

== Economic reform in the USSR and Russia ==
Economic reforms began in the Soviet Union when Perestroika was introduced in June 1985 by the then Soviet leader Mikhail Gorbachev. Its literal meaning is "restructuring", referring to the restructuring of the Soviet economy.

During the initial period (1985–1987) of Mikhail Gorbachev's time in power, he talked about modifying central planning, but did not make any truly fundamental changes (uskoreniye, acceleration). Gorbachev and his team of economic advisers then introduced more fundamental reforms, which became known as perestroika (economic restructuring).

== Economic reform in Africa ==
Economic reform began in Africa in the mid-1990s. Before that, the two decades of donor-sponsored reform efforts to Africa failed to help most sub-Saharan economies to overcome the fiscal and balance of payments deficits. During the mid-1990s, several civil wars ended and a wave of democratization started. The growth rate reached 1.2 percent a year between 1994 and 1997 which is the highest rate during that generation. However, the growth is a result of a donor-led process of structural adjustment as compatible with the survival of the status quo. The growth rate started to decline after 1998 and civil wars reactivated again by then. The two-decade failure reform leaves many African countries incapable of leading another economic reform.

== Economic reform in North Korea ==
North Korea is a communist country with the central economic planning system. With the ongoing nuclear issue, North Korea is politically and economically isolated from other countries. Therefore, several tries for economic reforms did not appear to be successful.

Its economy relied heavily on the defense industry and the consumer goods industry had been overlooked according to the juche policy. Under the Third Seven-Year Economic Plan (1987–93), DPRK aimed to focus on technology-based industry and to solve their scarcity of electricity. Nevertheless, it did not give a satisfiable result. One of the causes was its relationship with trading partners and losing supportive allies. In response, North Korea tried to attract foreign investors by endorsing joint venture and opening some free-trade zones. Unluckily, with other factors, this policy was not practical. In addition, it also had to encounter a massive military expenditure to secure its leader with both internal and external threat.

Later in 2002, there was another attempt to make a market liberalization reform, which the government tries to let the demand and supply determine the price level, which used to be controlled by the central government. It also gave some authority to local producers to make some economic decisions by themselves. Other than the decentralization policy, North Korea also kept trying to induce foreign investors in several ways, including depreciation of its currency and the initiation of Sinuiju Special Administrative District.

Still, its solution to successfully reform its economy appears to be contradicting with its leader security regimes. Kim Jong-il's goal, “kangsong taeguk” or “rich nation/strong army,” appears to be unachievable. It caused him facing a reform dilemma. Opening up the country likely to facilitate the reform to be successful, while it would also make its dictatorship insecure.

== See also ==
- Monetary reform
- New public management
- Tax choice
