= National Competition Policy (Australia) =

The term National Competition Policy refers to a set of policies introduced in Australia in the 1990s with the aim of promoting microeconomic reform.

== Origins ==
In 1992, an independent committee of inquiry, the National Competition Policy Review Committee, was established by Prime Minister Paul Keating to inquire into and advise on appropriate changes to legislation and other measures in relation to the scope of the Trade Practices Act 1974 and the application of the principles of competition policy. The committee was chaired by Fred Hilmer and also comprised Geoffrey Tapperall and Mark Rayner.

The report was commissioned against a backdrop of major microeconomic reforms led by the Keating Government, but slow progress on areas of the economy sheltered from competition as a result of constitutional limits on the application of the Federal Trade Practices Act or of other actions by Federal or state governments. The report thus had important implications for state-owned enterprises, many of which had begun entering into commercial activities; the professions, which were excluded from the application of Federal law; certain agricultural marketing entities granted monopoly rights; and certain infrastructure entities.

The report was prepared through a consultation process that included public solicitation of submissions, public meetings, and extensive discussions with State governments. The Committee presented its report, commonly referred to as the 'Hilmer Report', in 1993. The principal recommendations were:

- to bring all commercial activity in Australia within the purview of the Trade Practices Act, regardless of legal form or ownership of the enterprise, thus putting to an end anomalies arising from the division of constitutional authority between Federal and State governments.
- to establish a new regulatory regime to prevent enterprises that controlled an "essential facility" with natural monopoly characteristics from abusing their market power. The new "access regime" was to be part of an expanded Trade Practices Act.
- to establish a set of principles which all Australian Governments should adopt, the most important of which were:
  - legislative or regulatory impediments to competition should be subject to review to ensure the costs associated with reduced competition were exceeded by public benefits
  - before engaging in commercial activity, state-owned entities should be subject to "competitive neutrality" requirements to address distortions to competition arising from their various policy privileges.
- to reform the organisational arrangements competition policy in Australia, by expanding the role of the Trade Practices Commission (to be renamed Australian Competition & Consumer Commission) establish a Competition Policy Council to advise on issues arising the inter-governmental arrangements.

The report's recommendations were endorsed in their entirety by Federal and State governments but opposed by a range of other parties such as the Greens and the Democrats and independents. The recommended changes to the Trade Practice Act were implemented quickly, and the report was also used as the basis of the Competition Principles Agreement reached at the 1995 meeting of the Council of Australian Governments (COAG). The term 'Hilmer reforms' is now used to refer to processes arising from the intergovernmental Competition Principles Agreement and the associated Competition Policy Reform Act 1995 (Cwlth).

== Key provisions ==
The stated objective of National Competition Policy, as it applies to the public sector, is to achieve the most efficient provision of publicly provided goods and services through reforms designed to minimise restrictions on competition and promote competitive neutrality. The principal reform required under the policy is the application of a public benefit test to justify the maintenance of any public policy that prima facie restricts competition. Policies for which a public benefit cannot be demonstrated must be repealed or modified so that they do not reduce competition.

The objective of competitive neutrality policy is the elimination of resource allocation distortions arising out of the public ownership of entities engaged in significant business activities: Government businesses should not enjoy any net competitive advantage simply as a result of their public sector ownership. Such principles apply only to the business activities of publicly owned entities, not to the non-business non-profit activities of such entities.

Other areas of National Competition Policy require structural reform of public monopolies and require owners of monopoly facilities to negotiate third-party access agreements with other users.

== Benefits ==
Studies undertaken by the Productivity Commission, a strong advocate of microeconomic reform, concluded that the Hilmer reforms had a substantial impact on productivity growth and helped to underpin the strong period of economic growth that Australia enjoyed in the 1990s and the early 2000s. Critics argued that the evidence was at best inconclusive.

== Controversy ==
While the report itself involved a limited public consultation process, the relatively rapid pace of implementation of the report's recommendations allowed few opportunities for public education and debate. That contributed to a hostile public reaction, which was particularly evident in support for Pauline Hanson's One Nation party in the 1998 Queensland election.
