= European Biofuels Technology Platform =

The European Biofuels Technology Platform (BiofuelsTP) is a European Seventh Framework Programme initiative to improve the competitive situation of the European Union in the field of biofuel.

The programme is a joint initiative (Public-Private Partnership) of the European Commission, representing the European Communities, and the industry. The main objective of the programme is to produce a Strategic Research Agenda. The BiofuelsTP initiative was launched at a Conference in June 2006.

== See also ==
- European Technology Platform
