= European Technology Platform Nanomedicine =

The European Technology Platform on Nanomedicine (ETP Nanomedicine) is a European Technology Platform initiative to improve the competitive situation of the European Union in the field of nanomedicine, the application of nanotechnology to medicine.

== Overview ==
An important initiative, led by industry, has been set up together with the European Commission. A group of 53 European stakeholders, composed of industrial and academic experts, has established a European Technology Platform on nanomedicine. The first task of this high level group was to write a vision document for this highly future-oriented area of nanotechnology-based healthcare in which experts describe an extrapolation of needs and possibilities until 2020. Beginning of 2006 this Platform has been opened to a wider participation (December 2006: 150 member organisations) and has delivered a so-called Strategic Research Agenda showing a well elaborated common European way of working together for the healthcare of the future trying to match the high expectations that nanomedicine has raised so far.

== Policy Objectives ==
- Establish a clear strategic vision in the area resulting in a Strategic Research Agenda.
- Decrease fragmentation in nano-medical research.
- Mobilise additional public and private investment.
- Identify priority areas.
- Boost innovation in nanobiotechnologies for medical use.

== Topics ==
Three key priorities have been confirmed by the stakeholders:

- Nanotechnology-based diagnostics including imaging.
- Targeted drug delivery and release.
- Regenerative medicine.

Dissemination of knowledge, regulatory and IPR issues, standardisation, ethical, safety, environmental and toxicity concerns as well as public perception in general and the input from other stakeholders like insurance companies or patient organisations play an important role.

== See also ==
- European Technology Platform
- Joint Technology Initiative
