= Third-party access =

Third party access policies require owners of natural monopoly infrastructure facilities to grant access to those facilities to parties other than their own customers, usually competitors in the provision of the relevant services, on commercial terms comparable to those that would apply in a competitive market.

== Australia ==
Third party access policies play an important role in Australia's National Competition Policy, and are applied to "essential infrastructure which cannot be economically duplicated", including gas networks, electricity transmission and distribution grids, water transportation and sewerage networks, telecommunications networks, rail networks, ports, and airports.

One complication in Australia is that water is generally retailed at "postage stamp" or statewide prices for social equity reasons, to ensure that rural, regional, and remote customers do not pay more than urban customers for their water. Under these prices, low-volume, high-cost remote customers cross-subsidise high-volume, low-cost urban customers. As the prices are not cost-reflective, except in a system-wide sense, they cannot be considered commercial or competitive.

== United States ==
The third-party access right (‘TPA’) in the energy market context is the idea that in certain circumstances economically independent undertakings operating in the energy sector should have a legally enforceable right to access and use various energy network facilities owned by other companies.

== Europe ==
The Internal Market in Electricity Directive envisage the third-party access right as a crucial element of organisation of access to the energy infrastructure system in Europe and as the main instrument for opening the Internal Energy Market to competition.
