= Energy mix =

Primary energy sources from which secondary energy for direct use is produced

World energy mix (1965–2020)

The energy mix is a group of different primary energy sources from which secondary energy for direct use - such as electricity - is produced. Energy mix refers to all direct uses of energy, such as transportation and housing, and should not be confused with power generation mix, which refers only to generation of electricity, as electricity only accounts for 20 % of the world's final energy consumption.

== Energy Mixes ==
=== World ===
Primary energy consumption, primary energy mix and power generation mix in 2022
| Energy source | Energy consumption (TWh) | Primary energy mix | Electricity production (TWh) | Power generation mix |
|---|---|---|---|---|
| Oil | 52,969 | 29.6 % | 904 | 3.15 % |
| Coal | 44,854 | 25.1 % | 10,212 | 35.6 % |
| Gas | 39,413 | 22.0 % | 6,444 | 22.5 % |
| Hydropower | 11,300 | 6.32 % | 4,289 | 15.0 % |
| Traditional biomass and biofuels | 12,310 | 6.89 % | 675 | 2.36 % |
| Nuclear | 6,702 | 3.75 % | 2,632 | 9.18 % |
| Wind | 5,488 | 3.07 % | 2,098 | 7.32 % |
| Solar | 3,448 | 1.93 % | 1,310 | 4.57 % |
| Other renewables | 2,413 | 1.53 % | 96.8 | 0.34 % |
| Total | 178,897 | 100 % | 28,661 | 100 % |

Overall primary energy consumption in the United States in 2015 relied most on petroleum (35 quadrillion British thermal units (3.7×10^{16} kJ)), natural gas (29×10^{15} BTU (3.1×10^{16} kJ)) and coal (16×10^{15} BTU (1.7×10^{16} kJ)). Renewables contributed 9×10^{15} BTU (9.5×10^{15} kJ) and nuclear power 8×10^{15} BTU (8.4×10^{15} kJ). In the same year, about 4 million GWh of electricity were generated in the United States, 67% of which was generated from fossil fuels (coal, natural gas, and <1% petroleum), 20% from nuclear power, 6% hydropower and 7% other renewables.

World energy consumption (1970–2020)

In 2018, the global primary energy source was about 80% fossil fuels: (33.6% oil, 27.2% coal, 23.9% natural gas), 6.8% hydro, 4.4% nuclear, and 4% other renewables, such as wind, thermal, bioenergies, solar, and waste. Energy consumption worldwide rose 2.9%, which is the largest increase since 2010. Europe used less oil than the global percentage, and more nuclear and renewable resources, with France using less gas and more nuclear. North America had the highest consumption per resident, with Russia in second, and Europe and the Middle East following. While North America used 240 gigajoules per capita, Africa used only 15 gigajoules per capita.

== Sustainability ==
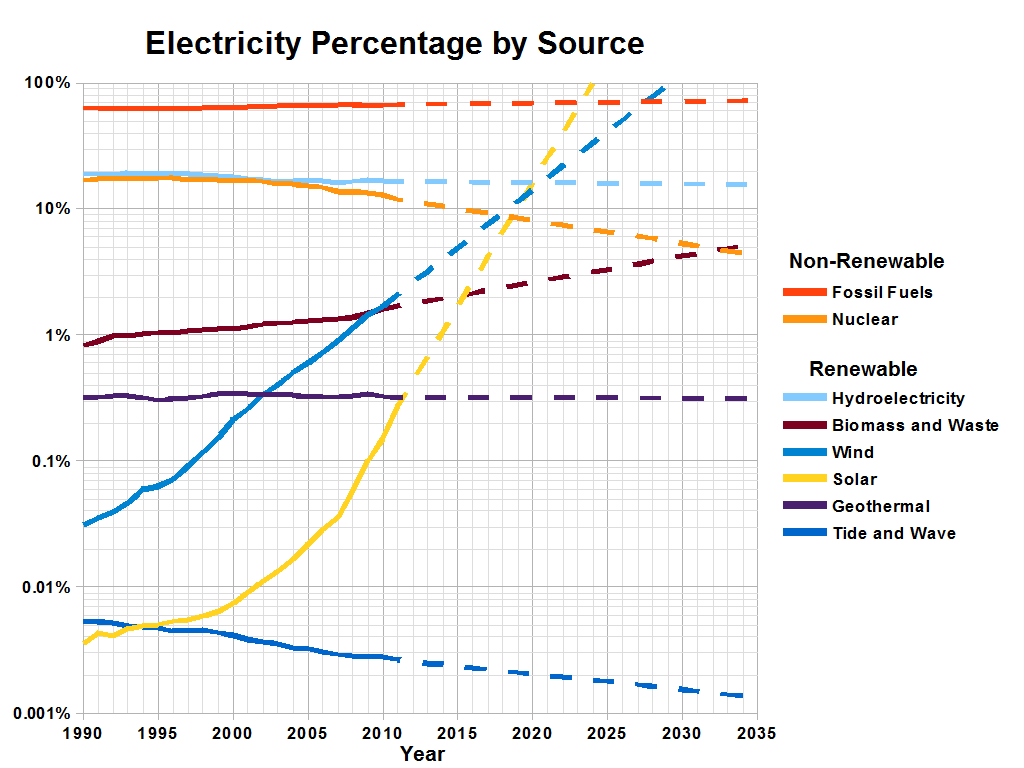
Percentages of primary energy sources used to produce electricity worldwide, with forecast

As energy consumption rises, attention has turned to more environmentally sustainable practices. 2018 saw the largest increase in worldwide energy consumption since 2010, with 27.2% of that energy coming from coal. The carbon dioxide released when coal is burned to produce energy accounts for 44% of the world's carbon emissions. Petroleum use accounts for nearly 1/3 of the world's carbon emissions. These factors contribute to the global temperature increase.

Many countries, such as Pakistan and Malaysia have begun developing options for more sustainable energy practices. Some of these options include wind, for small to medium-sized projects; solar power; and biomass, which is energy produced from waste products such as rice husks, animal waste, and crop residue.

The IEA has developed a plan, called the Sustainable Development Scenario (SDS), which would lead to an 800 Mtoe decrease in global energy consumption by utilizing changes in the sectors of residential and transport energy. Following this scenario, fossil fuel usage would drop significantly, but it would require a dramatic increase of use of renewable resources, particularly in Asia.

== Economic Aspects ==
Even in the energy mix, there can be monostructures. While renewable energy is almost exclusively produced in Germany (99.2%), there is a high and risky dependence on imports for fossil energy in some instances. To reduce or avoid these monostructures, diversification must change the energy mix so that one-sided import and export dependencies with individual countries are entirely or partially eliminated. Furthermore, the range of fossil energy sources must be taken into account.

The continuous monitoring of dependencies and ranges are the essential tasks of energy policy. For example, if a country primarily exports its goods or services to a single other country, a maximum monostructure exists. This carries the risk that economic crises (for instance, the other country suffers from a lack of foreign currency and can no longer afford the imports) or political conflicts (boycotts, embargoes) could lead to the importing country defaulting. Conversely, the same risk exists with monostructural imports, and it must be minimized by the importing state. The risk to the importing state can be classified as performance risk, and for the exporting state as payment risk. From this perspective, the Nord Stream 2 project contradicts the rules of a diversified energy mix.

The Russian invasion of Ukraine has brought the risks of the German energy mix into focus. The high dependence on imports of energy sources from Russia carries the risk that a conceivable Russian economic sanctions could affect German energy security. As reported by Economics Minister Robert Habeck in March 2022, short-term contracts are intended to reduce dependence on Russian natural gas (from 55% to 30%), crude oil (from 35% to 25%), and coal (from 50% to 25%).

The international energy transition, like the energy transition in Germany, is expected to have huge impacts on the energy mix. Since such energy transitions are carried out through state regulatory intervention, divestments in the extensive fixed assets of operators (closure of mines, decommissioning of nuclear facilities) and investments in future markets (renewable energies) are associated with long-term adjustment measures in the energy industry. Very long service lives could therefore not be realized. For many technical installations that are to be shut down prematurely, the payback period (amortization) had not yet been completed, so that a premature closure subsequently represents a Malinvestment.

== See also ==
- World energy supply and consumption – Global production and usage of energy
- Energy development – Methods bringing energy into production
- Energy consumption – Consumption of energy by animals and societies
- Energy independence – Independence or autarky regarding energy resources, energy supply and/or energy generation
- Efficient energy use – Methods for higher energy efficiency
- Energy transition – Significant structural change in an energy system
- Fossil fuel phase-out – Gradual reduction of the use and production of fossil fuels
- Fossil fuels lobby – Lobbying supporting the fossil fuels industry
- Fuel mix disclosure
- Policy mix – Combination of a country's monetary and fiscal policy
