= European Technology Platform for Wind Energy =

The European Technology Platform for Wind Energy (TPWind) is a European Seventh Framework Programme initiative to improve the competitive situation of the European Union in the field of wind energy.

The programme is a joint initiative (Public-Private Partnership) of the European Commission, representing the European Union, and the industry. The main objective of the programme is to produce a Strategic Research Agenda (SRA).

== See also ==
- European Technology Platform
- Joint Technology Initiative
