= Stop Bloody Energy =

Pro-Ukraine boycott of Russian energy

Stop Bloody Energy project is a global initiative of Ukrainian energy companies aimed at refusing to buy Russian energy resources and cooperating with Russia in the energy sector due to its war against Ukraine. The project was launched by Rinat Akhmetov's private company DTEK and the state-owned companies Naftogaz and Ukrenergo.

== Reception in Ukraine ==
President of Ukraine Volodymyr Zelenskyy supported the project, calling on Western companies to impose an embargo on Russian oil and gas.

"Buying Russian oil and gas, you are financing the killings of Ukrainians. Act more decisively. It is enough to feed the Russian military machine", President Zelensky said in an official telegram.

Mariupol Mayor Vadym Boychenko supported the project and called on EU countries to strengthen sanctions against Russia, including a full embargo on Russian oil and gas to stop the genocide of Ukrainians.

== Reception in the world ==
The Special Envoy of the Prime Minister of the United Kingdom Catherine Meyer supported the initiative of Ukrainian companies on the inadmissibility of cooperation with Russia in the energy sector.

On April 29, 2022, during a full-scale Russian invasion of Ukraine, hundreds of people picketed Engie's office as part of Stop Bloody Energy. The protesters wanted to end gas contracts with Russia and stop giving money to a country that supports terrorism.

On May 24, 2022, during the World Economic Forum in Davos, dozens of activists from Ukraine and Europe took part in the Stop Bloody Energy initiative against the energy business, which, despite armed aggression, continued to operate in Russia and buy Russian energy resources.

On May 31, the European Union approved a sixth package of sanctions against Russia over Russia's invasion of Ukraine. The sanctions related to energy are also a part of the sixth package. In particular, the EU prohibits the purchase, import, or transportation of crude oil and certain petroleum products from Russia to the EU. The planned duration of the gradual withdrawal from Russian oil is from 6 months for crude oil to 8 months for other oil products. A temporary exemption is made for EU member states that depend on Russian oil supplies because of their location and have no other good options. These countries can import crude oil by pipeline.

== See also ==
- REPowerEU
- The Second Cold War
- Protests against the Russian invasion of Ukraine
- International reaction to the Russian invasion of Ukraine in 2022
