= European-Latin American Technology Platforms =

FIRST Implementing cooperation on Future Internet and ICT Components between Europe and Latin America
- FIRST
- Website: http://www.latin-american-technology-platforms.eu/

The FIRST project was an FP7 Support Action intended to foster cooperation in the area of Internet technologies between Europe and Latin America FIRST focuses primarily on five countries: Argentina, Brazil, Chile, Colombia and Mexico. The project intended to extend the constituency of European Technology Platforms (ETPs) to strategic stakeholders from the different sectors included in the field of Future Internet (FI): networks, contents and services, ICT Components and systems.

The European research community in each area is structured into several 'European Technology Platforms (ETP) led by relevant industry stakeholders.

FIRST used this structure of ETPs to classify Latin American stakeholders, and the evaluation of potential areas for cooperation between Europe and Latin America. This structure was used during the launch of the Latin American Technology Platforms (LATPs). Using the European ETPs model for LATPs facilitated the establishment of liaisons, the identification of counterparts and the identification of common interests.
