= European Technology Platform for the Electricity Networks of the Future =

The European Technology Platform (ETP) for the Electricity Networks of the Future (SmartGrids) is a European Commission initiative that aims at boosting the competitive situation of the European Union in the field of electricity networks, especially smart power grids. The ETP represents all European stakeholders. The establishment of an ETP in this field was for the first time suggested by the industrial stakeholders and the research community at the first International Conference on the Integration of Renewable Energy Sources and Distributed Energy Resources, which was held in December 2004.

The SmartGrids Platform was started by the European Commission Directorate General for Research of the European Commission in 2005.

== See also ==
- Net metering
- Unified Smart Grid or USG (United States proposed system)
- V2G

== Sources ==
- International Conference on the Integration of Renewable Energy Sources and Distributed Energy Resources
- Strategic Research Agenda
