= Electricity Directive 2019 =

Directive 2019/944
- European Union directive
- Title: Electricity Directive
- Made by: European Parliament & Council
- Made under: Arts. 47(2), 55 and 95
- Journal reference: L176, 15 July 2003, pp. 37–55

History
- Date made: 26 June 2003
- Entry into force: 5 June 2019

Other legislation
- Replaces: Directive 96/92/EC, 2003/54/EC, 2009/72/EC

The Electricity Directive 2019 (2019/944) is a Directive in EU law concerning rules for the internal market in electricity.

== Background ==
The first Electricity Directive 96/92/EC on common rules for the internal market in electricity aimed to create an internal market for electricity. Concrete provisions were thought to be needed to ensure a level playing field in generation and to reduce the risks of market dominance and predatory behaviour, ensuring non-discriminatory transmission and distribution tariffs, through access to the network based on third-party access rights and on the basis of tariffs published prior to their entry into force, and ensuring that the rights of small and vulnerable customers are protected and that information on energy sources for electricity generation is disclosed, as well as reference to sources, where available, giving information on their environmental impact.

To ensure efficient and non-discriminatory network access, the updated Directive sought to ensure distribution and transmission systems are operated through legally separate entities where vertically integrated undertakings exist. Independent management structures had to be in place between the distribution system operators, the transmission system operators, and any generation/supply companies. Legal separation does not imply a change of ownership of assets and nothing prevents similar or identical employment conditions applying throughout the whole of the vertically integrated undertakings. However, a non-discriminatory decision-making process should be ensured through organisational measures regarding the independence of the decision-makers responsible.

The 1996 Directive was updated and replaced by the Electricity Directive 2003/54/EC, followed by Directive 2009/72/EC, and then the current Electricity Directive 2019/944.

== Contents ==
Articles 3 to 6 require that different enterprises have rights to access infrastructure of network owners on fair and transparent terms, as a way to ensure different member state networks and supplies can become integrated across the EU.

Article 8 requires that electricity or gas enterprises acquire a licence from member state authorities

Article 35 requires that there is legal separation into different entities of owners of networks from retailers, although they can be owned by the same enterprise, to ensure transparency of accounting.

== See also ==
- EU law
- Energy policy of the European Union
