= Liberalization =

Relaxation of previous government restrictions

Liberalization (American English) or liberalisation (British English) is a broad term that refers to the practice of making laws, systems, or opinions less severe, usually in the sense of eliminating certain government regulations or restrictions. The term is used most often in relation to economics, where it refers to economic liberalization, the removal or reduction of restrictions placed upon (a particular sphere of) economic activity. However, liberalization can also be used as a synonym for decriminalization or legalization (the act of making something legal after it used to be illegal), for example when describing drug liberalization.

== In economy and trade ==
Economic liberalization refers to the reduction or elimination of government regulations or restrictions on private business and trade. It is usually promoted by advocates of free markets and free trade, whose ideology is also called economic liberalism. Economic liberalization also often involves reductions of taxes, social security, and unemployment benefits.

Economic liberalization is often associated with privatization, which is the process of transferring ownership or outsourcing of a business, enterprise, agency, public service or public property from the public sector to the private sector. For example, the European Union has liberalized gas and electricity markets, instituting a competitive system. Some leading European energy companies such as France's EDF and Sweden's Vattenfall remain partially or completely in government ownership. Liberalized and privatized public services may be dominated by big companies, particularly in sectors with high capital, water, gas, or electricity costs. In some cases they may remain legal monopolies, at least for some segments of the market like consumers. Liberalization, privatization and stabilization are the Washington Consensus's trinity strategy for economies in transition.

The Bretton Woods Conference of 1944, which recommended the establishment of International Monetary Fund (IMF) and the World Bank, had also recommended the establishment of an International Trade Organization (ITO). Although, the IMF and the World Bank were established in 1946, the proposal for ITO did not materialize. Instead, the General Agreement on Tariff and Trade (GATT), a less ambitious institution, was formed in 1948. The primary objective of GATT is to expand international trade by liberalizing trade so as to bring about all round economic prosperity. GATT was signed in 1947, came into effect in 1948 and lasted until 1994. It was replaced by the World Trade Organization in 1995. The original GATT text (GATT 1947) is still in effect under the WTO framework. Thus liberalization was born.

There is also a concept of hybrid liberalization. For instance, in Ghana, cocoa crops can be sold to competing private companies, but there is a minimum price for which it can be sold and all exports are controlled by the state. The term liberalization has its origin in the political ideology liberalism, which took form by the early 19th century.

== In social policy and government ==
In social policy, liberalization may refer to a relaxation of laws restricting certain practices or activities, such as divorce, abortion, or psychoactive drugs. Regarding civil rights, it may refer to the elimination of laws prohibiting homosexuality, private ownership of firearms or other items, same-sex marriage, inter-racial marriage, or inter-faith marriage.

There is a distinct difference between liberalization and democratization. Liberalization can take place without democratization, and deals with a combination of policy and social change specialized to a certain issue, such as the liberalization of government-held property for private purchase. Democratization is politically highly specialized; it can arise from a liberalization but works on a broader level of governmental liberalization.

== See also ==
- Artistic freedom
- Civil libertarianism
- Cultural liberalism
- Decriminalization of sex work
- Deregulation
- Drug liberalization
- Emancipation
- Energy liberalisation
- Free trade
- Freedom of speech
- Freedom of thought
- German reunification
- Libertarianism
- Liberty
- Marketization
- Oligopoly
- Sex-positive movement
- Sexual revolution
- Social liberalism
