= REPowerEU =

Plan of the European Commission to end the Union's dependence on Russian fossil fuels

REPowerEU is a European Union plan to end its dependence on Russian fossil fuels. The European Commission presented the plan in May 2022, after Russia's full-scale invasion of Ukraine drove up energy prices and raised fears of supply shortages. The plan promotes energy savings and development of renewable energy, alongside alternatives to Russian fuel supplies. It builds on the European Green Deal and the Fit for 55 package.

EU countries can add REPowerEU chapters to their national recovery plans. These set out investments in energy infrastructure, renewable energy and energy efficiency, with funding from the EU’s Recovery and Resilience Facility.

Since the plan was launched in 2022, Russia’s share of EU natural gas imports fell from 45% in 2021 to 12% in 2025.

In January 2026, the EU adopted a regulation providing for a gradual ban on Russian gas imports. The ban applies to LNG contracts from 1 January 2027 and pipeline contracts from 30 September 2027.

== Background ==
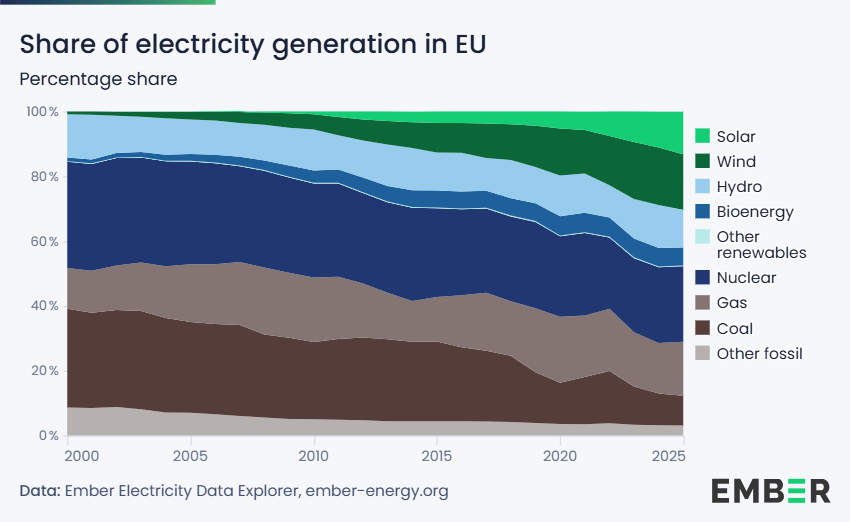
Electricity generation in the EU by source - percentage share

Before 2022, the EU relied heavily on imports of fossil fuels from Russia, which was its largest external energy supplier. Russia accounted for approximately 40% of the EU's natural gas imports, alongside substantial shares of oil and coal. However, this dependence varied considerably among Member States. Germany and Italy were among the largest consumers of Russian gas, while Poland and the Baltic States pursued diversification strategies aimed at limiting reliance on Russian energy due to historical concerns. In several Member States, close energy relations with Russia were supported by national energy companies such as ENI, Uniper, and Wintershall, which facilitated long-term supply arrangements. More precisely, these contrasting perspectives were particularly evident in Germany's traditional view of energy cooperation as means of engagement and stability in relations with Russia, an approach commonly associated with its Ostpolitik which contributed to sustained support for Russian gas imports over several decades.

As a result, prior to the adoption of REPowerEU, Member States continued to follow different national approaches. Germany and Austria supported the Nord Stream 2 gas pipeline, Bulgaria facilitated the transit of the TurkStream pipeline through its territory, and the Netherlands maintained energy cooperation with Russia amid declining domestic gas production. Despite being the EU's largest gas consumer, Germany had no operational liquefied natural gas (LNG) import terminals before 2022 and had made relatively limited efforts to diversify gas supply sources compared with some other Member States.

Underlying vulnerabilities in the EU energy system became increasingly visible in the second half of 2021, when energy prices began to rise sharply due to high import dependence and limited supply diversification. These pressures intensified following Russia's invasion of Ukraine in February 2022, which raised concerns about potential supply disruptions across Europe. The energy crisis triggered by the invasion of Ukraine led to a significant increase in electricity prices across Europe, partly due to the structure of the EU electricity market, where prices are often set by the marginal cost of production. As natural gas prices rose sharply in 2021 and 2022, electricity prices increased accordingly, making the reduction of dependence on imported gas a central objective of EU energy policy. In March 2022, the European Commission announced initial measures to reduce imports of Russian fossil fuels, followed shortly by a call from EU leaders at the Versailles Summit for a coordinated phase-out strategy.

At the national level, many Member States rapidly adjusted their energy policies. Germany announced the construction of several LNG import terminals and sought alternative suppliers, while Italy expanded gas imports from countries including Algeria, Azerbaijan, Libya, and Qatar. Although these measures helped prevent immediate energy shortages, the initial response was largely driven by national governments and companies. This led to competition among Member States on global energy markets and contributed to higher prices. To address such challenges, the EU introduced coordination mechanisms including joint gas purchasing through the AggregateEU platform, aimed at reducing intra-EU competition and strengthening collective energy security.

== Policy goals ==
=== Saving energy ===
One of the main objectives of REPowerEU is to reduce overall energy consumption in the EU, thereby lowering demand for natural gas and improving energy efficiency. This approach is intended to reduce dependence on gas imports, particularly from Russia, and to strengthen the resilience of the EU energy system.

Following the energy crisis triggered by Russia's full-scale invasion of Ukraine, the EU adopted the Gas Demand Reduction Regulation as an emergency measure. "The regulation encouraged Member States to voluntarily reduce gas demand by 15% relative to the 2017-2021 average. That target was exceeded, and even after the regulation expired in March 2024, gas consumption remained below pre-crisis levels. Between August 2022 and January 2025, the EU reduced its gas demand by about 17%, saving 70 bcm per year."

Energy efficiency measures were also strengthened. "The EU raised its 2030 efficiency target, requiring an 11.7% reduction in final energy consumption. As buildings use more than half of the EU's natural gas, new rules were introduced to make buildings more efficient and to accelerate renovations. By 2023, final energy consumption had fallen to 894 Mtoe, around 5.6% lower than in 2021. Full implementation of the revised Energy Efficiency and Energy Performance of Buildings directives remains necessary to meet the 2030 targets."

Last but not least, measures to improve energy security were introduced alongside demand reduction efforts. "After gas storage levels declined sharply in late 2021, the EU adopted rules requiring gas storage facilities to be filled to at least 90% of capacity before each winter. This threshold was reached ahead of schedule in both 2023 and 2024. By the end of the winter 2024-25, storage levels stood at around 34% on 1 April 2025, broadly in line with pre-crisis averages. These measures contributed to greater supply stability and reduced price volatility"

=== Diversify energy supplies ===
Another central objective of REPowerEU is to reduce the EU's reliance on Russian fossil fuels by diversifying energy sources and strengthening supply infrastructure. Since its introduction, imports of Russian oil, coal and gas have declined substantially. EU sanctions and increased imports from alternative suppliers contributed to this reduction. "By the mid-2020s Russian crude oil accounted for approximately 3% of the EU's oil imports, down from about 27% in 2022."

Imports of Russian LNG and pipeline gas into the EU declined from 152 billion cubic metres in 2021 to 36 billion cubic metres in 2025, while their share of overall EU gas imports declined from 45% to 12%.

"To support diversification, the EU established the EU Energy Platform in December 2022 followed by the AggregateEU joint purchasing mechanism in April 2023. AggregateEU enabled participating countries to coordinate gas purchases on a voluntary basis. Although the mechanism expired in March 2025, the European Commission has proposed developing a permanent framework for collective purchasing of gas and other strategic energy commodities. Furthermore, international energy cooperation has also expanded. The EU strengthened partnerships with key suppliers such as Norway, the United States, and countries in North Africa, particularly in relation to natural gas and emerging hydrogen markets."

=== Clean energy ===
Lastly, accelerating the deployment of renewable and low-carbon energy is a further core objective of REPowerEU, aimed at improving energy security while supporting the EU's climate goals.

"Electricity generation from renewable sources, particularly wind and solar power, has grown rapidly since 2022. Wind and solar combined have generated more electricity than gas and by 2023, wind on its own produced more electricity than gas. In October of that same year, the EU revised the Renewable Energy Directive, introducing a binding target for renewable energy to account for at least 42.5% of final energy consumption by 2030, with the ambition of reaching 45%."

"The deployment of heat pumps, which play a key role in clean heating, increased sharply in 2022 but slowed in subsequent years due to higher costs and installation challenges. To align with 2030 climate targets, the EU launched the Heat Pump Accelerator in January 2025." REPowerEU also promotes the development of renewable gases and hydrogen. Efforts include increasing biomethane production, establishing regulatory frameworks for hydrogen markets, and expanding electrolyser capacity across the EU.

== Funding ==
The Recovery and Resilience Facility (RRF), part of NextGenerationEU, is the main source of EU funding for REPowerEU. In February 2023, the EU amended the RRF regulation to fund REPowerEU measures through national recovery plans. Countries added chapters describing their proposed reforms and investments, with milestones and targets for assessing progress.

An additional €20 billion was made available in grants. Countries could also apply for unused loans under the RRF. Of the additional grant funding, 60% came through the Innovation Fund and 40% through sales of EU Emissions Trading System allowances. Countries could also transfer funds from the Brexit Adjustment Reserve and, within existing limits, cohesion policy funds.

Member states could request advance payments of up to 20% of the funds allocated to their REPowerEU chapters. Subsequent payments depended on meeting the milestones and targets agreed in their recovery plans.

== Criticism ==
Despite being presented as complementary to the European Green Deal, the REPowerEU plan has attracted criticism regarding its coherence with the EU's long-term climate objectives.

=== Tensions between energy security, climate objectives, and environmental sustainability ===
According to Beatriz Pérez de las Heras, one major concern relates to the tension between short-term energy security measures and climate mitigation goals. Although REPowerEU increases targets for renewable energy and energy efficiency, its implementation has also seen some Member States, such as Germany, France, Austria and the Netherlands, turn back to coal and other fossil fuels in order to compensate for reduced gas supplies from Russia. Although these measures were presented as temporary, they are considered incompatible with the EU's objective of reducing greenhouse gas emission and achieving climate neutrality by 2050. In light of this situation, another critic concerns the diversification of fossil fuels suppliers. REPowerEU has led to increased imports of liquefied natural gas (LNG) from distant countries such as the U.S. and Qatar. These imports cause higher methane emissions and require new fossil fuel infrastructure, which risks prolonging the EU's reliance on gas beyond the short term. Furthermore, environmental impacts have also been questioned. Achieving the objectives of the REPowerEU, depends heavily on access to large quantities of raw materials and rare minerals that are needed for renewable energy technologies such as solar panels, electrolysers, etc. Many of these materials are sourced from China, which also plays a major role in mineral extraction in African countries (e.g. Democratic Republic of Congo). This dependence raises concerns about the European Green Deal's goals by creating new external dependencies and shifting environmental impacts beyond the EU, rather than building on a sustainable and resilient transition. Lastly, in the same light as above, another concern relates to energy security. Increased gas imports through pipelines from countries such as Algeria and Azerbaijan may reduce dependence on Russian supplies, but risk replacing one dependency with others. This strategy may address short-term needs without fully resolving long-term energy security challenges.

=== Energy security and uneven reduction of Russian dependence ===
This shift away from Russian energy dependence is not absolute, and progress remains uneven across the EU. While overall EU reliance on Russian fossil fuels has declined, "less than 19% of total EU gas imports in 2024", some Member States continue to depend on Russian energy to a greater extent than others. In 2024, countries such as France, Spain and Belgium accounted for the majority of the EU's Russian LNG imports in 2024, even as most of their LNG came from other suppliers, particularly the U.S. Hungary and Slovakia also remain heavily dependent on Russian oil. These dynamics highlight that, although the EU is moving away from Russian energy, vulnerabilities persist and some countries are still more exposed than others.

=== One of the policy goals in decline: heat pumps ===
The European Commission has identified heat pumps as a key technology for clean heating and for meeting the EU's 2030 climate goals. Although installations increased sharply in 2022, deployment slowed significantly in 2023 and 2024. According to the European Heat Pump Association (EHPA), sales in 14 major European countries fell by an average of 22% in 2024 after years of steady growth. The steepest drops occurred in Germany and France where sales fell by 48% and 39% respectively. Overall, only around 2 million heat pumps were sold in 2024, representing a 23% drop compared with 2023.

The decline has serious consequences for the heat pump industry, which had expanded production in previous years, especially in 2022 and 2023, when demand was strong. As a result of this slowdown, at least 4.000 jobs were lost and over 6.000 workers faced reduced working hours. EHPA argues that the decline was mainly due to high purchase and installation costs, which were harder for households to afford during a period of inflation and high interest rates. In addition, high electricity prices compared with gas prices reduced the financial attractiveness of heat pumps, particularly in Belgium and Poland. Finally, frequent changes to subsidy schemes and policies created uncertainty, leading many consumers to delay investment decisions.

Against this backdrop, early signs of recovery were seen in 2025. Heat pump sales increased by 9% in the first half of 2025 compared with the same period in 2024. Sales rose from 898,000 units in the first half of 2024 to 980,000 units in the first half of 2025, although overall sales remain below the peak reached in earlier years, due to policy uncertainty and reduced incentives.

== See also ==
- Stop Bloody Energy
