= Technological platform =

There is no agreed-upon definition of the term "technological platform" within the broadest interpretation of it as a full set of technological means that enable creation of devices, processes, and technologies. Other terms to define the "set of technologies that have been developed for various applications but share a common underlying basic concept" include "technology platform", "technical platform", "common platform", and, for particular fields, "ecommerce platform", "IT platform". Business models of multiple companies, so called platform businesses or simply "platforms", are built around data aggregation and data processing algorithms. They include major technology companies like Google and Meta Platforms.

The term is actively used in the areas of government, business, and science in multiple languages.

== Information technology platform ==
In the information science, the technology platform is a digital platform made of adaptable components that interoperate within a layered, modular architecture. IT platforms are vital for social, commercial, governmental and political operations in the 21st century, and are influencing these interactions.

== Use by governments ==
The governments use the term to define a collective effort by the state, business, science and education parties to develop proprietary commercial technology in a certain field.

=== European Union ===
European Union documents refer to European Technology Platform (ETP) since 2002 as part of the Framework Programmes for Research and Technological Development. This is the continuation of the Lisbon Strategy with its target of spending 3% of the GDP on research and the European Research Area of 2000. The platform creation process got moving in 2003.

The ETP was mentioned for the first time in the European Commission document "Industrial policy in an enlarged Europe" (2002), with an early actual platform predating the term (Advisory Council for Aeronautics Research in Europe, 2001). Multiple ETPs have been established since then, including:

- European Technology Platform Nanomedicine
- European Construction Technology Platform
- European Steel Technology Platform
- European Space Technology Platform
- European Biofuels Technology Platform
- European Technology Platform on Smart Systems Integration
- European Technology Platform for the Electricity Networks of the Future
- European Technology Platform for Wind Energy
- European-Latin American Technology Platforms

== Sources ==
- Bartelheimer, Christian; zur Heiden, Philipp; Lüttenberg, Hedda; Beverungen, Daniel (2022). "Systematizing the lexicon of platforms in information systems: a data-driven study" (PDF). Electronic Markets. 32 (1): 375–396. doi:10.1007/s12525-022-00530-6. ISSN 1019-6781.
- Belyakov, G P; Avramchikova, N T; Belyakova, G Y; Chuvashova, M N (2016). "Technology platforms: opportunities and development perspectives". IOP Conference Series: Materials Science and Engineering. 155 012003. doi:10.1088/1757-899X/155/1/012003. ISSN 1757-8981.
- "Industrial policy in an enlarged Europe". EUR-Lex. 2002.
- Luksha, O. P. (2010). "Европейские технологические платформы: возможности использования европейского опыта для создания нового инструмента содействия инновационному развитию российской экономики" [European technology platforms: opportunities to use European experience to create a new instrument to promote innovative development of the Russian economy]. Инновации (in Russian) (9): 34–41.
- Morozova, Ekaterina; Mishlanov, Yaroslav (2014). "Linguistic ontology modeling in the domain of economics" (PDF). In Budin, Gerhard (ed.). Languages for Special Purposes in a Multilingual, Transcultural World. ISBN 978-3-200-03674-1.
- Raymond, Peter D. (2022). Re-Platformed Planet The Rise and Spread of Chinese Technology Platform Companies (Doctor of International Affairs thesis). Johns Hopkins University. doi:10.13140/RG.2.2.22090.54725.
- Tkachenko, Stanislav; Zhiglinskaya Wyrsch, Natalia; Cui, Zheng (2022). "Technology platform competition between the United States and China: Decoupling and sanctions against Huawei". Vestnik of Saint Petersburg University. International relations. 14 (4): 379–392. doi:10.21638/spbu06.2021.401.
