= Family Help & Wellness =

American behavioral health program provider

- Abbreviation: FHW
- Formation: 2008
- Type: Behavioral Health Provider
- Headquarters: Salem, Oregon
- Location: Salem, OR, United States
- Coordinates: 44°56′32.94″N 123°2′7.83″W
- Staff: 1,150+ employees
- Website: Official website

Family Help & Wellness is a provider of private pay behavioral health programs for youth and young adults ages 5–28. Their programs include Wilderness Therapy programs, assessment centers, therapeutic boarding schools, residential treatment centers, and transitional living in total, they operated 9 programs in 2024. At least two of these (Trails Carolina and Asheville Academy) have since been shut down following the deaths of youth in their programs.

== Background ==
Family Help & Wellness was established in 2008. their headquarters is located in Salem, Oregon.

Elevations is partnered with several troubled teen programs. It provides management, financial, and marketing support to Elevations’ ownership team.

Family Help & Wellness is owned by private equity investors Trinity Hunt Partners who first invested in 2014.

Family Help grew by taking over defunct facilities from other troubled teen companies. The company's founder Dupell was the executive vice president and CFO of Aspen Education from 1999 until 2004. Dupell also served as the CEO of Family Help until 2017 when he stepped down following criminal convictions for cocaine use and property damage.

Dupell's predecessor, Steven Stradley, stepped into the position in 2017. He first joined FHW in 2014. Before that, he worked for the elder care company, SunWest Management Services, as the VP Risk & Administrative Services from 2002-2011. During that time, Sunwest Management was hit with California and Oregon class-action lawsuits, alleging unlawful business practices, false advertising, and Consumer Protection Act violation, and was charged with securities fraud by the federal government. Sunwest Management's CEO, Jon Harder, pleaded guilty to fraud and money laundering charges and was sentenced to 15 years in prison, but his sentence was commuted by former president Donald Trump in one of Trump's final official acts as president. Stradley has a Business Finance Degree.

=== Controversies and deaths ===
==== Trails Carolina homicide investigations ====
In 2014, Alec Lansing (age 17) participant ran away from Trails Carolina, a Family Help & Wellness residential camp. Lansing later died of hypothermia after going missing for 12 days.

On the morning of February 3, 2024, a 12-year-old boy was killed by staff after one night at Trails Carolina wilderness program by Family Help and Wellness. The cause of death was determined to be asphyxia from being 'sealed' in a bivy sack overnight, and it was ruled a homicide.

The Transylvania County Sheriff's Office launched an investigation into the death. The boy had arrived at Trails Carolina on February 2, 2024, after being transported by two men from New York to Trails Carolina. On February 6, the investigators executed a search warrant on Trails Carolina. Trails Carolina refused to co-operate with the investigation. On February 13, 2024 North Carolina Department of Health and Human Services told Trails Carolina it was to stop new admissions during the investigation. On February 18, 2024, all children were removed from Trails Carolina. On May 17, 2024, the North Carolina Department of Health and Human Services permanently revoked Trails Carolina's license. On June 25, 2024, the medical examiner's report was released.

==== North Carolina investigation into Asheville Academy ====
On May 8, 2025, a thirteen-year-old killed herself at Asheville Academy, another Family Help & Wellness center. In response, on May 27, 2025, the state ordered that the school must stop new admission.

On May 29, 2025, a second death occurred, also ruled a suicide. On May 31, 2025, Asheville Academy closed down and released all of its students.
