= Guy Dollé =

French businessman

Guy Dollé (born 1942) is a French businessman. He was the CEO of the European steel manufacturer Arcelor until 2006. He was ousted as CEO following Arcelor's merger with Mittal Steel (now ArcelorMittal) at the end of a protracted takeover contest.

Dolle had opposed the takeover, preferring a hastily drawn up plan to merge with Russian company Severstal, praising the owner as a "true European." He described Mittal's products as low-grade eau de cologne compared with perfumes produced by Arcelor. He had also described Mittal's shares as "monkey money", interpreted by many as a racist attack on Mittal.

In an article entitled "Arcelor's Chief Is Ousted From Mittal Partnership", The New York Times wrote that it was announced that Arcelor Mittal would be replacing him with a new chief executive. Dollé, who sat silently in the front row, hastily left the news conference refusing to answer questions.
