= Energy liberalisation =

Provision of energy utilities by market mechanisms

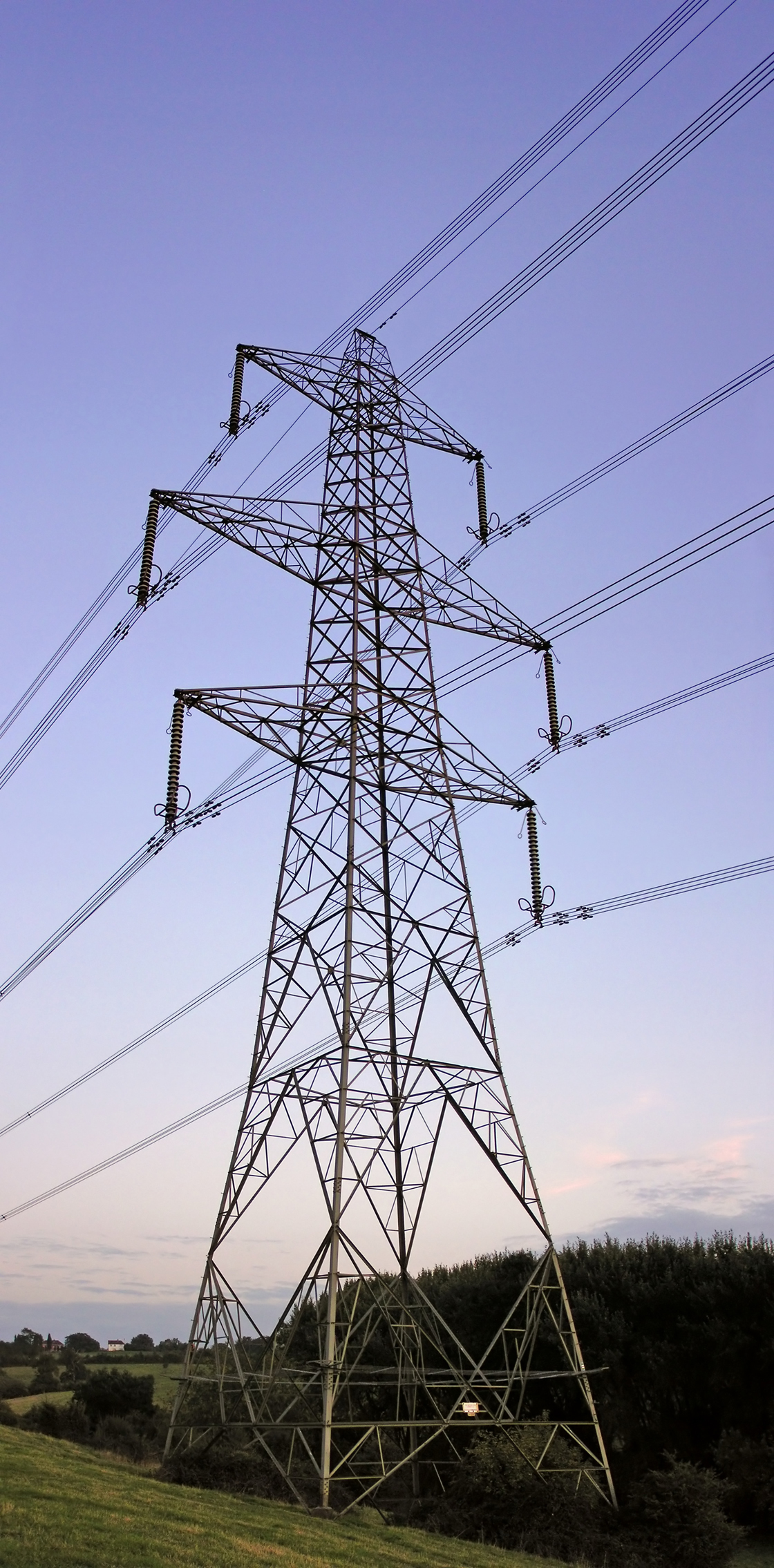
Many liberalisation programmes entail the separation of corporate responsibility between power distribution and generation

Energy liberalisation refers to the liberalisation of energy markets, with specific reference to electricity generation markets, by bringing greater competition into electricity and gas markets in the interest of creating more competitive markets and reductions in price by privatisation. As the supply of electricity is a natural monopoly, this entails complex and costly systems of regulation to enforce a system of competition.

A strong drive for liberalisation occurred in European Union energy markets at the turn of the millennium, directed by European Commission directives favouring market liberalisation promulgated in 1996, 2003, and 2009. These programmes were supported with the interest of increasing the interconnectedness of European energy markets and building the common market. Similar initiatives, to varying degrees, have been pursued in nations around the world, such as Argentina, Chile, and the United States.

== British model ==
A standard model for electricity liberalisation is the "British model", a reform plan which consists of six reforms: (1) creation of a competitive market for electricity, (2) the breakup of monopolized supply such that each consumer can select their provider, (3) separation of network maintenance from generation, (4) separation of direct supply from the generation of electricity, (5) creation of an incentive structure to set market prices in monopolistic competition, and (6) the privatisation of formerly state-owned assets. It was implemented under the Thatcher years as part of a mass privatisation campaign of many of the industries nationalised by previous Labour governments in the preceding decades. The risks involved for both generators and distributors have led to vertical re-integration.

== Benefits of liberalisation ==
Proponents of liberalisation assert that the main benefit comes from the increased competition afforded to the market. This would increase the availability and distribution of energy in supply situations by building transparent price signals and diversifying the production of electricity between gas-turbine technologies to nuclear energy. It would also lead to the elimination of unnecessary overhead supply in formerly nationalised markets, allowing for capital resources to be utilised more effectively on things such as network infrastructure instead of maintaining idle power stations. These increases in efficiency have led to lower prices paid by consumers in nations, such as the United Kingdom, which have more heavily pursued deregulation.

The creation of pooled energy sources per the British model and other systems adopted in Chile and Texas have led to greater demand price-response, allowing for the more efficient use of electricity and increasing the response of consumers to prices so fewer costs are afforded to them. Furthermore, the greater interconnectedness of networks has allowed for markets to be more able to respond to peak energy demand and thereby increase the security of energy networks.

== Problems with liberalisation ==
Liberalisation of electricity tends to substantially benefit large consumers (mainly industrial users), but benefits for domestic consumers compared with a public monopoly or a regulated private monopoly are questionable, as liberalisation has been shown to pass on supply costs onto consumers. There are also doubts over whether the system can ensure long-term security of supply through providing sufficient incentives to begin building generation capacity in time for when it is needed, an issue which has started to plague Britain in the mid-2010s as spare capacity has decreased significantly to just over 1.2 percent in 2015.

Furthermore, the experience of electricity liberalisation in developing countries has proven problematic, as many large multinationals withdrew support for power plant construction projects in the start of the 21st century, leaving countries such as Argentina, Colombia, Chile, and Uganda to pick up the bill for the expansion of their electric networks. The privatisation of electricity favoured by liberal economists mirroring the British model have also led to increased expenditure on advertising and power switching incentives for consumers.

The nature of the natural monopoly coming from electricity generation is also an issue which has gone unaddressed. Because of the monopolistic competition inherent to the energy market, there are significant issues with collusion by firms to raise prices. To prevent these issues as well as those associated with direct intervention to build new generation capacity, governments have had to step in to further regulate and build such capacity directly, effectively defeating the point of liberalisation. These issues have been compounded with growing geopolitical instability in Eastern Europe and concerns over gas pipelines in Ukraine.

== Europe ==
In the European Union, a strong policy of liberalisation of the European energy markets was pursued by the European Commission in the 1990s and the first decade of the 21st century. The first liberalisation directive for the electricity markets was adopted in 1996 and for the gas markets in 1998. The next directives were adopted in 2003. It was replaced by Directive 2009/72/EC of 13 July 2009, following a proposal by the European Parliament and the European Council in 2007 concerning separation of supply and generation or production activities.

An analysis of PSIRU states that it seems that the European Commission's liberalisation directives were motivated more about taking control of electricity from national governments, creating large European electricity companies that can compete strongly in the world market and destroying nationally owned monopoly companies, rather than a belief in the market.

== See also ==
- Electricity market
- European Union competition law
- General Agreement on Trade in Services (GATS)
- Privatisation
