= Framework Programmes for Research and Technological Development =

Science funding in Europe

The Framework Programmes for Research and Technological Development, also called Framework Programmes or abbreviated FP1 to FP9, are funding programmes created by the European Union/European Commission to support and foster research in the European Research Area (ERA). Starting in 2014, the funding programmes were named Horizon.

The funding programmes began in 1984 and continue to the present day. The most recent programme, Horizon Europe, has a budget of 95.5 billion Euros to be distributed over seven years.

The specific objectives and actions vary between funding periods. In FP6 and FP7, focus was on technological research. In Horizon 2020, the focus was on innovation, delivering economic growth faster, and delivering solutions to end users that are often governmental agencies.

== Background ==
Conducting European research policies and implementing European research programmes is an obligation under the Amsterdam Treaty, which includes a chapter on research and technological development. The programmes are defined by commission civil servants who are aided by various official advisory group and lobby groups. To advise the European Commission on the overall strategy to be followed in carrying out the Information and Communication Technology thematic priority, the Information Society Technologies Advisory Group (ISTAG) was set up.

== The framework programmes ==
The framework programmes, up until Framework Programme 6 (FP6), covered five-year periods; but from Framework Programme 7 (FP7) onward, programmes run for seven years. The Framework Programmes, and their budgets in billions of Euros, are presented in the table below. For FP1–FP5, program expenditures were made in European Currency Units; from FP6 onward budgets were in Euros. The values presented below are in Euros.

ID	Framework programme	Period	Budget (billion €)
FP1	First	1984–1987	3.8
FP2	Second	1987–1991	5.4
FP3	Third	1990–1994	6.6
FP4	Fourth	1994–1998	13.2
FP5	Fifth	1998–2002	15.0
FP6	Sixth	2002–2006	16.3
FP7	Seventh	2007–2013	50.5 over seven years + 2.7 for Euratom over five years
FP8	Horizon 2020 (Eighth)	2014–2020	77
FP9	Horizon Europe	2021–2027	95.5
FP10	Horizon Europe	2028-2034	175 (proposal)

== Funding instruments ==
=== FP6 and FP7 ===
Framework Programme 6 and 7 (2002–2013) projects were generally funded through instruments, the most important of which included:

- Integrating Project (IP)
  - Medium- to large-sized collaborative research projects funded in FP6 and FP7. They are composed of a minimum of three partners coming from three countries from Associated states but can join several tens of partners. The typical duration of such projects is three to five years but there is not a defined upper limit. The budget granted by the Commission can reach several tens of million euros, paid as a fraction of the actual costs spent by the participants.
  - IPs specifically aim at fostering European competitiveness in basic research and applied science with a focus on "addressing major needs in society" defined by the Priority Themes of the Framework Programme. Like STRePs (see below), IPs ask for a strong participation of small or medium-sized enterprises (SMEs) to ascertain the translation of research results into commercially viable products or services.
- Network of Excellence (NoE)
  - Medium-sized research projects co-funded by the European Commission in FP6 and FP7. These projects are "designed to strengthen scientific and technological excellence on a particular research topic through the durable integration of the research capacities of the participants."
  - NoE projects require the minimum participation of three EU member-nations, however, the commission expected projects would usually involve at least six countries. Projects are provided grants for a maximum of seven years. The budget granted by the Commission is €1–6 million per year depending upon the number of researchers involved.
  - An NoE project should not strictly be considered as a research project, since its aim is not to conduct research, but rather to contribute to the clarification of the concepts in the covered field.
- Specific Targeted Research Projects (STReP)
  - Medium-sized research projects funded by the European Commission in the FP6 and FP7 funding programs. STReP projects involve a minimum of three partners coming from three countries from Associated states. The typical duration of such projects is two to three years. In FP6, they generally involved between six and 15 partners. The budget granted by the Commission is in average around €2 million.

Note also the FP7 Joint Technology Initiatives (JTI) in partnership with industry. A specific action was the FIRST project, to foster cooperation in the area of internet technologies through the European-Latin American Technology Platforms.

=== Horizon 2020 ===
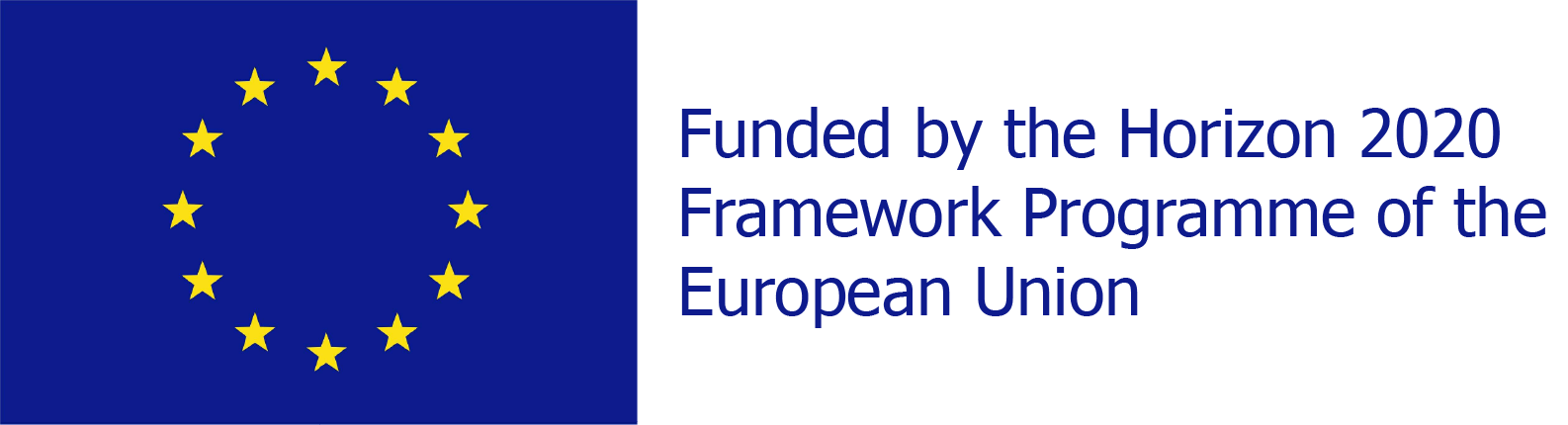
The Horizon 2020 logo, a European Union framework programme

Horizon 2020 was the eighth framework programme (FP8) funding research, technological development, and innovation. The programme's name has been modified to "Framework Programme for Research and Innovation".

The programme ran from 2014 to 2020 and provided an estimated €80 billion of funding, an increase of 23 per cent on the previous phase. The ERC, as one component of H2020, funded 6,707 research projects worth a total of €13.3 billion. From 2013 to 2020 the EU's European Research Council assigned to UK scientists €1.7bn in grants, more than any other country.

Horizon 2020 provided grants to research and innovation projects through open and competitive calls for proposals. Legal entities from any country were eligible to submit project proposals to these calls. Participation from outside the European Union was explicitly encouraged. Participants from European Union member states and countries associated to Horizon 2020 were automatically fundable.

Horizon 2020 supported open access to research results. Projects such as the European Processor Initiative, or the Exscalate4Cov project, were beneficiaries of Horizon 2020.

Horizon 2020 was succeeded by Horizon Europe in 2021.

==== Objective and pillars ====
The framework programme's objective is to complete the European Research Area (ERA) by coordinating national research policies and pooling research funding in some areas to avoid duplication. Horizon 2020 itself is seen as a policy instrument to implement other high-level policy initiatives of the European Union, such as Europe 2020 and Innovation Union.

The programme consists of three main research areas called "pillars":

- The first pillar, "Excellent Science", focuses on basic science. It has a budget of 24 billion euro.
- The second pillar is "Industrial Leadership", with a budget of 14 billion euro. It is managed by DG Enterprise and based on Europe 2020 and Innovation Union strategies. The goal is to find ways to modernize European industries that have suffered from a fragmented European market.
- The third pillar funds potential solutions to social and economic problems, "Societal challenges" (SC). The goal is implementation of solutions, less on technology development.

The structure follows the previous framework programme (FP7, 2007–2013) to the level of the sub-programmes under the pillars.

Horizon 2020 is also implementing the European environmental research and innovation policy, which is aimed at defining and turning into reality a transformative agenda for greening the economy and the society as a whole so as to achieve a truly sustainable development.

==== Agencies ====
The framework programme is implemented by the European Commission, the executive body of the European Union. More specifically, it is implemented by various agencies, including:

- Directorate-generals (DGs)
  - Directorate-General for Research and Innovation
  - Directorate-General for Communications Networks, Content and Technology
- Executive agencies
  - Research Executive Agency (REA)
  - Executive Agency for SMEs (EASME)
  - ERC Executive Agency (ERCEA)

==== Associated countries ====
Associated countries have signed an association agreement for the purposes of this framework programme. To date, 14 countries are associated to Horizon 2020. Participants from European Union member states and countries associated to Horizon 2020 are automatically funded.

Switzerland is considered as "partly associated" due to the 2014 referendums held by Switzerland, which free movement of workers between Switzerland and the EU was limited. Swiss organizations continue to be active participants in Horizon 2020, however, their participation is sometimes covered by national funding.

Israel is an associated country of Horizon 2020. A central point of negotiation was the funding of projects beyond the Green Line. Israel published its views in an Appendix to the official documents.

Armenia gained the status of associated country and Armenian researchers and organizations can participate in all Horizon programs on equal footing with EU member states.

== Feedback and improvements ==
The programmes have been criticized on various grounds, such as actually diminishing Europe's industrial competitiveness and failing to deliver fundamental excellence and global economic competitiveness.

In 2010, the Austrian Research Promotion Agency launched a petition calling for a simplification of administrative procedures, which attracted over 13,000 signatories. The numerous other criticisms of the petitioners were later distilled into a green paper. In Horizon 2020, there are significant simplifications: e.g. fewer funding rates (increasing the funding rates of the large companies), less reporting, less auditing, shorter time from proposal to project kick-off. In a Nature article in December 2020, Horizon 2020 is praised for being less bureaucratic than past framework programmes.

In 2021, the European Commission services introduced several simplifications in the new framework programme Horizon Europe, to facilitate the work of the beneficiaries especially in the reporting phase.

== See also ==
- Best Available Techniques Reference Document (BREF)
