= Kiril Tenekedjiev =

Bulgarian scientist

Kiril Ivanov Tenekedjiev
- Кирил Тенекеджиев
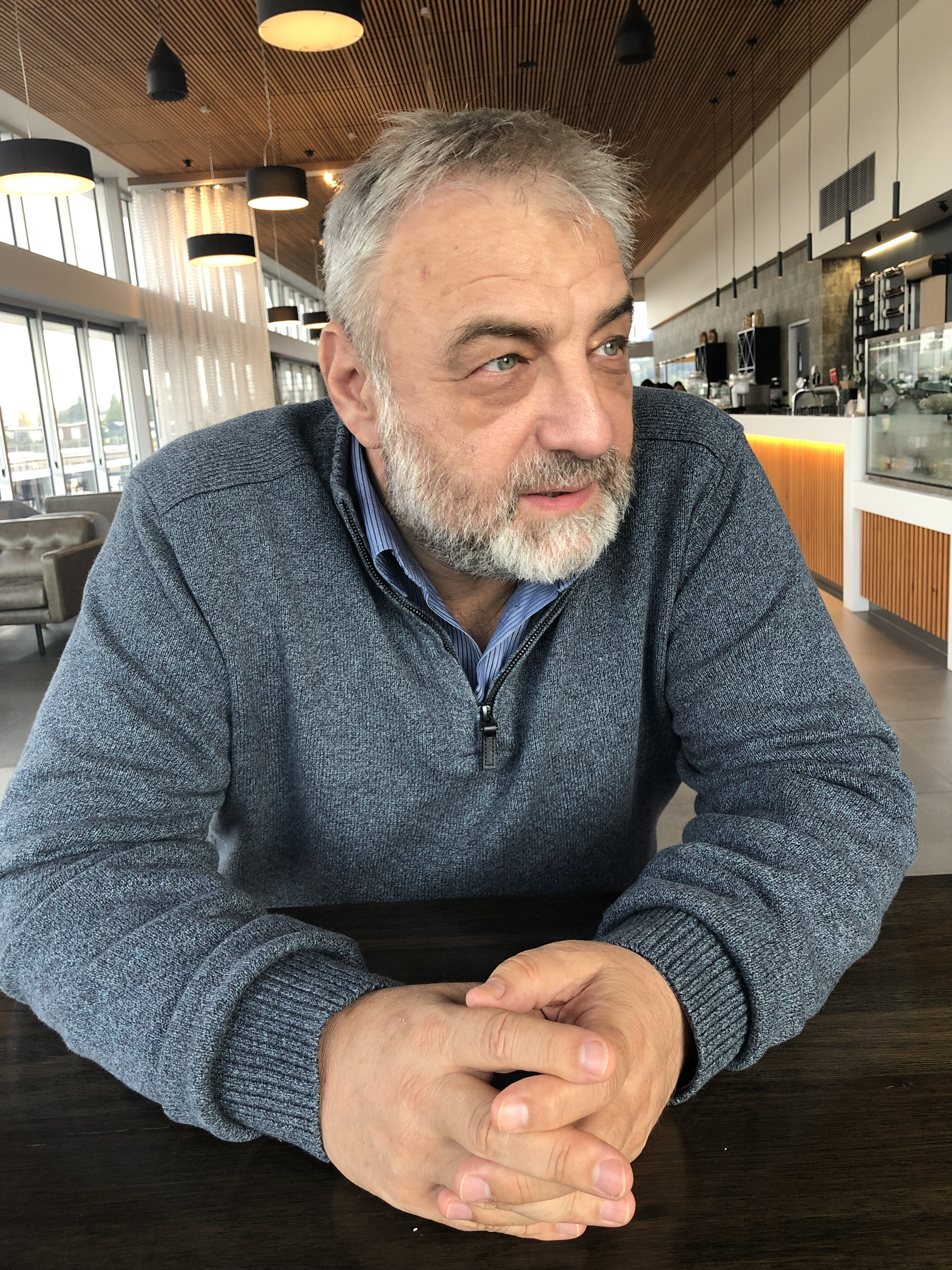
- Kiril Tenekedjiev in 2019
- Born: 18 December 1960 (age 65); Varna, Bulgaria
- Education: Technical University of Varna
- Scientific career
- Fields: Decision analysis; decision theory; applied mathematics
- Workplaces: Australian Maritime College; Nikola Vaptsarov Naval Academy; Technical University of Varna; Medical University of Varna; Institute for the Protection and Security of the Citizen; University of Adelaide
- Thesis: DSc: Quantitative decision analysis: utility theory and subjective statistics (2004); PhD: Technical diagnostics of complex energetic objects (1994)
- Website: http://www.tenekedjiev.com

Kiril Ivanov Tenekedjiev (Bulgarian: Кирил Иванов Тенекеджиев; born 18 December 1960 in Varna, Bulgaria) is a professor of quantitative decision analysis and subjective statistics. His research is in statistical pattern recognition, as well as his work on fuzzy-rational quantitative decision analysis and ribbon-risk analysis.

== Education and academic career ==
Kiril Tenekedjiev obtained his mechanical engineering degree (both a Bachelor and Master's degree) in ship machines and equipment from the Technical University of Varna, Bulgaria, in 1986. He was awarded a PhD degree in engineering from the Higher Attestation Commission of Bulgaria in 1994, undertaking his studies at the Technical University of Varna. His Doctor of Sciences degree from 2004, awarded by the Higher Attestation Committee of Bulgaria, was on a thesis entitled Decision Analysis: Utility Theory and Subjective Statistics. He was promoted to Full Professor by the Higher Attestation Committee of Bulgaria while still employed by the Technical University of Varna in 2008.

Kiril started his academic career in 1986, right after graduating from university. He worked as an operator with the ship propellers and cavitation unit of the Bulgarian Ship Hydrodynamics Center in Varna, Bulgaria. He worked on several research tasks there. After a year, he moved to the Technical University of Varna in 1987, where he was a lecturer in the Department of Resistance of Materials. He eventually spent some 12 years with the Department of Economics and Management, which was a part of the Faculty of Marine Sciences and Ecology at the time. In 2011, he took on a role as a Professor with the Faculty of Engineering, Department of Information Technologies of the Nikola Vaptsarov Naval Academy-Varna. Since 2016, he has been affiliated with the Australian Maritime College, University of Tasmania, Australia, as a professor in Systems Engineering.

Kiril has research interests in quantitative decision analysis, subjective and applied statistics, simulation modelling, data analytics, mathematical modelling of biochemical reactions, statistical pattern recognition and technical diagnostics.

Kiril served as a visiting lecturer with the Medical University of Varna and the Bulgarian Academy of Sciences. He has conducted specializations with the State University of New York (United States), Semmelweis University (Hungary) and Tokyo Institute of Technology (Japan). Since 2013, Kiril has served as a representative of Bulgaria to the TFEU Program Committee on "Smart, Green and Integrated Transport", Framework Program "Horizon 2020". Since early 2020, Kiril has been the Chair of the Tasmanian subsection of the IEEE Victorian section, Australia, on a two-year term. At the same time, he initiated his role as a Division Committee Member for the Tasmanian Division of Engineers Australia.

== Personal life ==
Kiril Tenekedjiev is the first of two children to Ivan Kirilov Tenekedjiev (a mechanical engineer), and Tatiana Museevna Tenekedjieva (a French language high school teacher).

== Awards ==
- In 2007, he was awarded a Senior Scholarship from the Bulgarian American Foundation for Educational Exchange (Bulgarian Fulbright Commission) and was sent on research and lecturing specialization with Binghamton University, USA 2007, working under the supervision of George Klir.
- In 2006, he was awarded certificate for a scientist, subject of biographical record in Who’s Who in the World, 23rd Edition 2006.
- In 2003, he served as Visiting Scholar with the Joint Research Centre of the European Commission, working for 9 months with the Institute for the Protection and Security of the Citizen, Ispra, Italy.
