= Faculty of Computing and Automation, Technical University of Varna =

Coordinates: 43.2235°N 27.9351°E

The Faculty of Computer Sciences and Automation is one of six faculties at the Technical University of Varna in Varna, Bulgaria. It includes the departments of Computer Science and Engineering, Software and Internet Technologies, Communication Engineering and Technologies, Automation, and Electronic Equipment and Microelectronics.

== History ==
The Faculty of Computer Sciences and Automation was established in 1989. Traditionally oriented towards physics and mathematics, the institution has shifted its focus towards computing and automation over the past decade.

== Deans of the faculty ==
- Prof. r.inzh. Vasil Smarkov
- Prof. r.inzh. Ivan Yanchev
- Prof. r.inzh. Valter Stanchev
- Prof. r.inzh. Ovid Farhi
- Prof. r.inzh. Petar Antonov

== Structure ==
=== Department of Computer Systems and Technologies ===
The Department of "Computing" was founded in 1982. The original faculty of the Computing Department were members of the "Radio" department. Initially, it was equipped with three laboratories to conduct exercises and research computer usage. Initially focused on IBM, the courses were oriented towards its software, operating systems, architectures, motherboards, printers and other connected devices. The department with was started with 10 teachers. In the late '80s, students arrived from neighbouring countries to the department including students from Iraq, Syria, Sri Lanka and Cambodia. After 2007, the department of Specialty Computer Engineering and Technology is among the most prestigious specialities in the university.

==== Heads of department ====
- Assoc. Prof. Dr.-Ing. Boris Ocheretyko
- Assoc. Prof. Dr. Eng. Vasil Sniffing

=== Department of Automation ===
The Department was established in 1970 with 300 students enrolled in various courses. Automated manufacturing techniques were being introduced to many industries at this time. The Electrical Engineering experience of the faculty provided a solid foundation for the Automation Department. The original staff of the Department were specialists from the Department of EMA and VMEI- Varna and were highly qualified personnel in the field of production automation. Private teachers Svetoslav Kolev and Nikolay Pantev Bangieva B. and C. Tzeneva lab and Hr. Petrova have contributed greatly to the development of the Department.

==== Heads of department ====
- Prof. Dr.-Ing. N. Svetoslav Kolev (1970-1985)
- Assoc. Prof. Dr. Eng. Mitko Iv. Dimchev (1985-1990)
- Assoc. Prof. Dr. Eng. Tsvyatko D. Lilov (1990-1994)
- Assoc. Prof. Dr.-Ing. Peter D. Petrov (1994-2009)
- Assoc. Prof. Dr. Eng. J. Emil Marinov (2009–??)
- Assoc. Prof. Nikolay Nikolov (present)
