= Stefan Lefterov =

Bulgarian artist (1945–1992)

- Stefan Lefterov - 1985
- Born: 1945; Dragijevo, Veliko Tarnovo, Bulgaria
- Died: 1992 (aged 46–47); Varna, Bulgaria
- Occupations: Painter, mathematician, physicist

Stefan Lefterov was a noted Bulgarian painter of futuristic art with more than 400 paintings large amount of which he donated to friends, colleagues and planetariums. He was the first author in his country to promote this style with art exhibitions and events.

== Biography ==
Born in the village of Dragijevo near Veliko Tarnovo, Bulgaria in the year of 1945. After graduating the St. Clement of Ohrid University of Sofia with a degree in physics he started working in the Technical University of Varna as an assistant professor in the mathematical department.

Being drawn towards futuristic and fantasy art since he was a child, Stefan Lefterov started mixing various painting techniques so that he can try to express his inner vision of futuristic landscapes and technology. Some of his methods and work were heavily criticized by his fellow art colleagues in the city of Varna for being based on academicism.

This forced him to study world art and to perfect his style. In the year of 1965 his paintings were shown in the Russian magazine "Technica Malodeji" ("Техника молодежи") and the Bulgarian "NT za mladejta" ("НТ за младежтa"). In the same year he makes an art exhibition in Varna, which in fact is the very first art exhibition with futuristic thematics in Bulgaria. He is a notable member of clubs with fantasy and futuristic design and ideas. Founder of the club "Andromeda".

He died in Varna in 1992.

== Works ==
Author of more than 400 paintings, some of which are located in private collection of people in England, Germany and Belgium. Paintings of Stephan Lefterov were presented at EXPO'70 in Osaka (Japan) and on the third "Evrokon" in Poznań, Poland. He explained that his personal favorites were in his solo exhibitions in the years of 1970, 1972 and 1978 in Varna.

There is a resident gallery of Stefan Lefterov in the planetarium of Varna (found in the sea garden). More of his works can be found in the planetarium in the city of Kardzhali. A large number of his paintings were donated by him to the Technical University of Varna and his colleagues during his years of work at the university.

== Awards ==
- 1971: Award in a Russian competition organized by the magazine "Technica Malodeji" ("Техника молодежи")
- 1985: Second award by the American magazine "Fandom Directory"
- 1985: Award by the EXPO'85 in the city of Plovdiv, Bulgaria.
- 1986: Third award by the American magazine "Fandom Directory"
- 1988: Honorable award for contribution in fantasy and futuristic art "Evrokon"
