= Faculty of Marine Sciences and Ecology, Technical University of Varna =

Structure in the University of Varna

The Faculty of Marine Science and Ecology (Bulgarian: Факултет по морски науки и екология) is the youngest unit in the structure of the Technical University of Varna.

== Departments ==
=== Physics ===
The physics department has been in existence since the beginning of the school in 1963. Katedrata existed in the structure of Electrical faculty. It began as "Physics and Chemistry" and became an independent department in 1976.

==== Heads of department ====
- Kiril Kazandjiev Petrov (1963–1983)
- Janko Bojinov (1984–1989)
- Ilka Ilieva Yordanova (1990–1999)
- Valentin Lyutskanov Lyutskanov (1999–)

=== Department of Ecology and Environmental Protection ===
==== Heads of department ====
- Nikolay Minchev

=== Department of Agronomy ===
==== Heads of department ====
- Dimitrov Plamenov

=== Department of Economics and Management ===
The department was established in 1966. The first teachers were Nikola Karklisiyski and Ivanka Chobanyaneva.

==== Heads of department ====
- Nikola Karklisiyski
- Marin Kanchev
- Ivanka Chobanyaneva
- G. Raikov
- Fanny Ouzounova
- Dimitrichka Macedonian
- Svetlana Dimitraki

=== Department of Navigation, transport management and protection of the waterways ===
This department was created as a "Marine training center".

==== Heads of department ====
- Chavdar Branimirov Ormanov
