= Institute for the Protection and Security of the Citizen =

Italian research institute

Coordinates: 45°48′14″N 8°37′45″E

The Institute for the Protection and Security of the Citizen (IPSC), located in Ispra, Italy, is one of the seven institutes of the Joint Research Centre (JRC), a Directorate-General of the European Commission (EC).

The mission of the IPSC is to "provide research results and support EU policymakers in their efforts to promote global security and protect European citizens from accidents, deliberate attacks, fraud and illegal actions against EU policies".
