= Technical University of Varna =

State university in Varna, Bulgaria

Coordinates: 43°13′26″N 27°56′10″E

Technical University
- Технически университет
- Motto: A posse ad esse
- Motto in English: From opportunity to reality
- Type: Public
- Established: 1962
- Affiliations: EUA
- Rector: Prof. Dragomir Plamenov
- Students: ~7500
- Location: Varna, Bulgaria
- Campus: Urban
- Website: www.tu-varna.bg

The Technical University of Varna (Bulgarian: Технически университет – Варна, often abbreviated as ТУ – Варна, TU – Varna) is a state university in Varna, Bulgaria, founded in 1962.

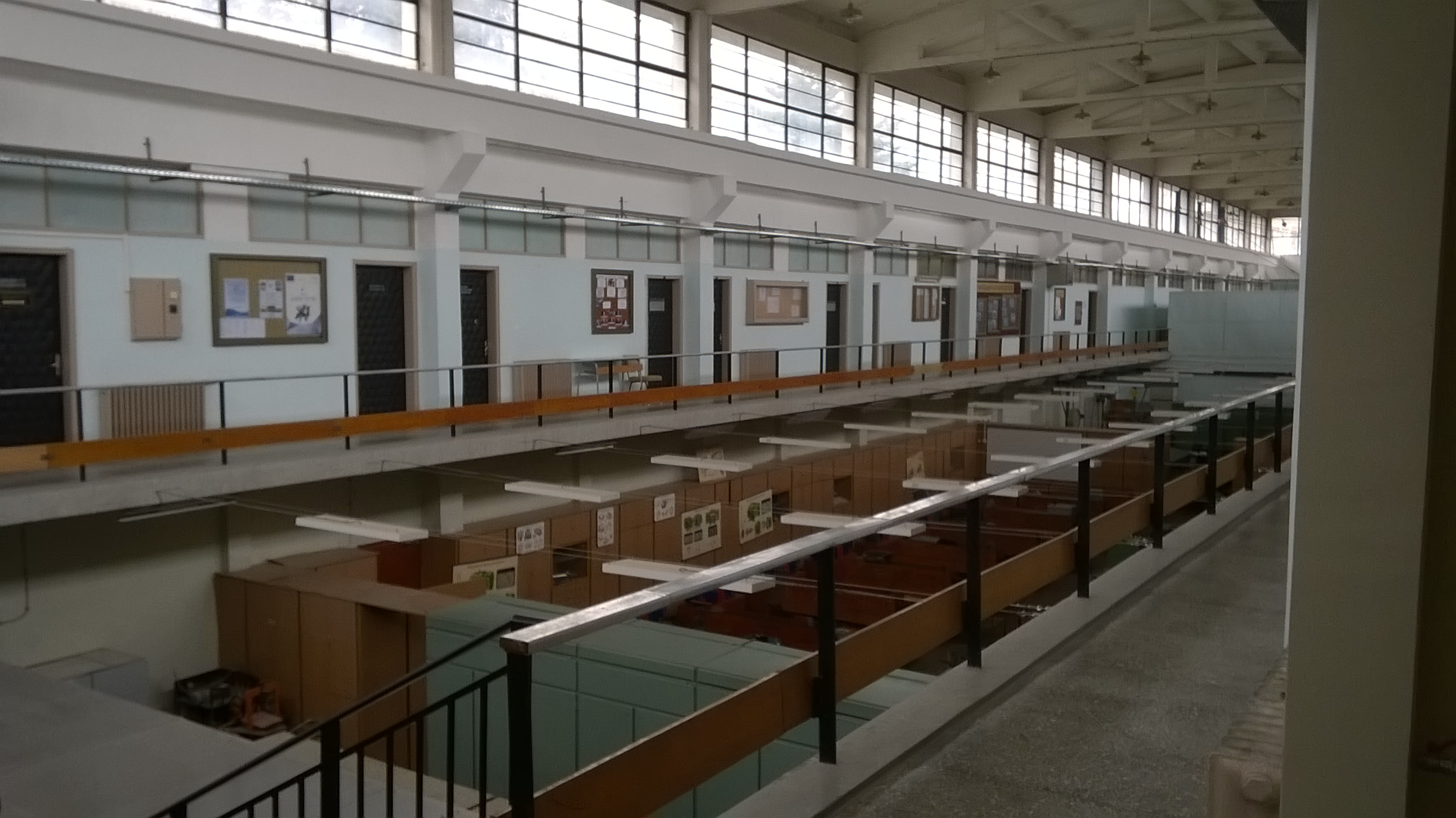
The Electrical Engineering Building

== History ==
=== Technical faculty ===
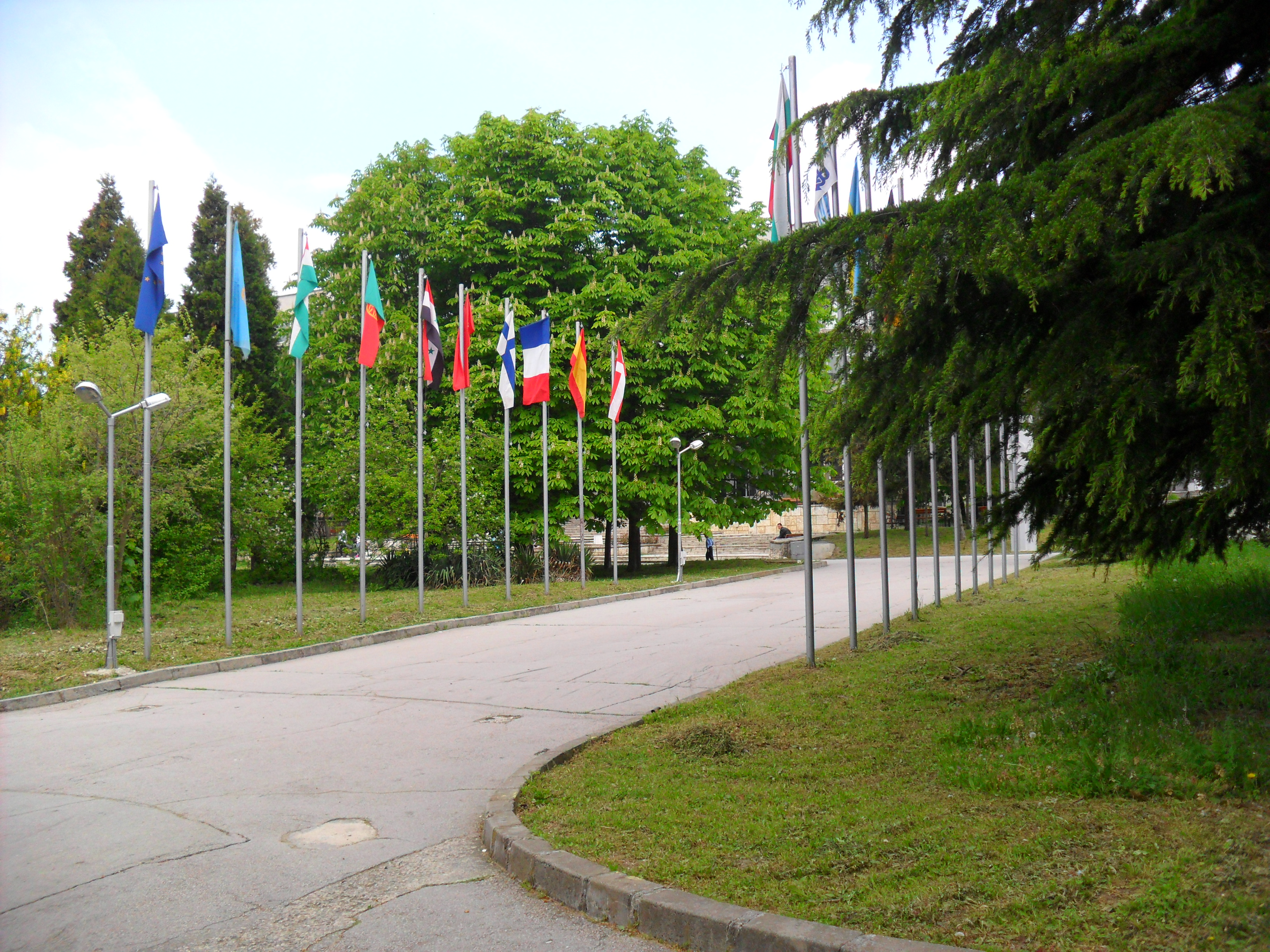
Entry to Technical University of Varna

In the early 1940s, the State University in Varna, St. Cyril Slavyanobulgarski (Bulgarian: Държавния университет „Свети Кирил Славянобългарски“) had two faculties, Economics and Technology. These faculties formed the foundation of the Technical University of Varna and MEI-Varna. The city of Varna had expertise in areas such as shipbuilding, mechanics, and building auto-body parts. That knowledge and experience led to the development of the technical faculty into an institution. In the 1950s, professors and engineers from other technical universities joined the State University.

The main areas of study were:

- Engineering
- Naval Architecture and Marine Engineering
- Electrical engineering
- Building architecture
- Industrial chemistry

The lecture courses and practical engineering work were carried out in the State University/University of Economics-Varna building. From 1958, the State University was composed of 30 departments.

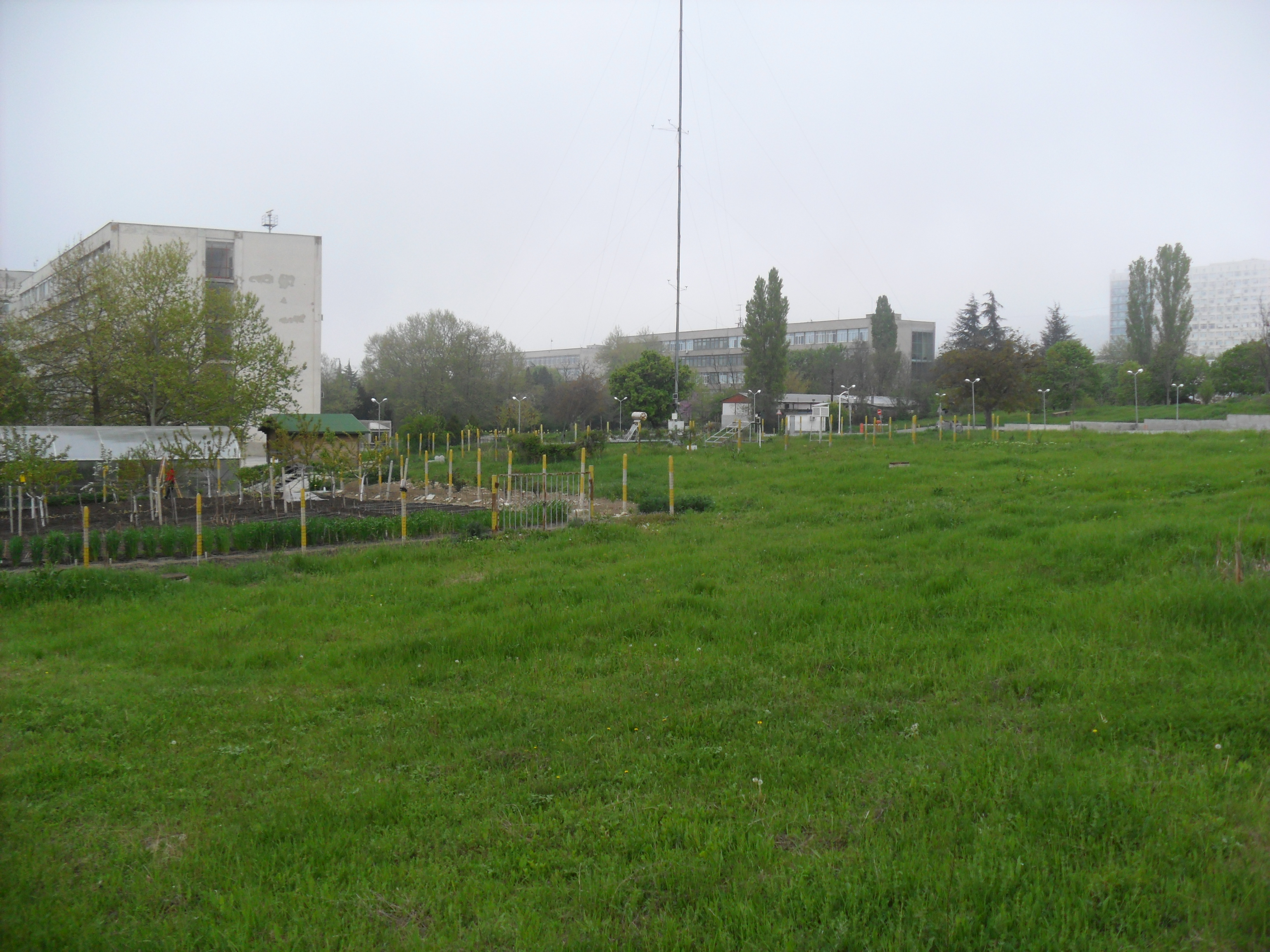
Campus, Technical University of Varna

=== Mechanical-Electrical Engineering Institute ===
By order of the Bulgarian Socialist Party in 1962, a Mechanical-Electrical Engineering Institute (MEI-Varna) (Bulgarian: Машинно-електротехнически институт (МЕИ-Варна) was founded in Varna. This institute was the first of its specialization in North Bulgaria. In the first academic year, the institute did not have a faculty structure. The founder of the institute was Professor Marin Oprev, an expert in steam engines, and steam and gas turbines. Oprev, also the university's first rector (chancellor), provided a stable beginning for the institute and established it as an important regional institution. In 1962, seven disciplines were included in the MEI-Varna:

- Manufacturing technologies
- Internal combustion engines
- Electrical machinery and apparatus
- Radio technology
- Telecommunications equipment
- Naval architecture and marine engineering
- Ship machines and mechanisms

In the first academic year (1963/1964), there were 554 students, and the discipline of shipbuilding was the only place for specialized engineers. The laboratories in the institute were supported by the engineering community in the region and a few factories from North Bulgaria. Georgi Ivanov was appointed the first assistant of the institute, and Professor Evgeny Vatev, D.Sc. Eng., was actively involved in the development of the institute. Professors from the Mechanical-Electrical Institute at Sofia and the University of Ruse lectured at MEI-Varna.

=== Higher Mechanical-Electrical Engineering Institute ===
Higher Mechanical-Electrical Engineering Institute (HMEI-Varna) (Bulgarian: Висш машинно-електротехнически институт (ВМЕИ-Варна)) became the name of the university after a few years of work in the areas of machine technologies, shipbuilding and marine technologies, electrics and communications. Professor Evgeny Vatev, D.Sc. Eng. created and managed the Chair of Physical Metallurgy and Technology of Materials, and was actively involved in the development of the institute. Vatev also served as deputy dean (re-elected three times), and was a founder and director of the Research Department of the institute. In 1967, Petar Penchev was chosen as rector. In 1968, the first building of the institute (now the Electrical faculty) was completed. Until 1971, the rectorate and all central functions were administered from this building. In 1971, the second main building, housing the Machine and Shipbuilding faculty, was completed.

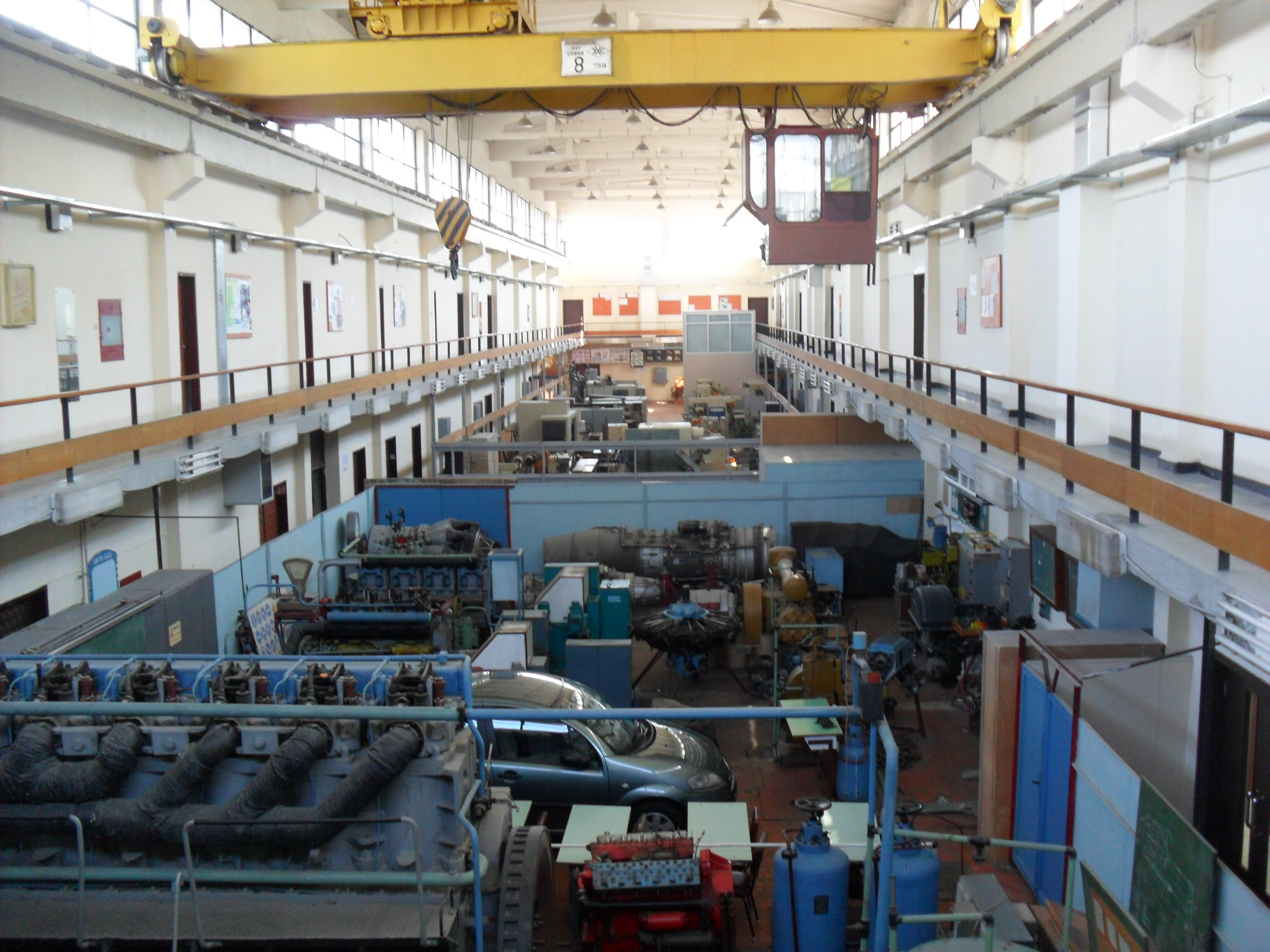
Main Laboratory in the Machine Engineering building

Departments in the beginning of the 1970s:

- Mechanical engineering and machine elements
- Internal combustion engines
- Technical mechanics
- Marine engineering
- Shipbuilding
- Naval architecture and marine engineering
- Electrical machinery and apparatus
- Electrical theory and measurement
- Electrical power
- Automation

Since it first opened, HMEI-Varna has grown from a regional to a national technical institute. In 1975, the construction of the Learning-Production Building was completed. This building included rooms for producing different types of electric and mechanical products. In 1987, the construction of the Computer Science's Building (in Bulgarian: Топла връзка) was completed.

In 1991, HMEI-Varna had six faculties: Machines, Machine-technology, Shipbuilding, Electricity, Computing, Legal and Automation. In 1992, a new building, the Learning House, opened its doors (in Bulgarian: Учебнен корпус). The Computer Science Department was founded the same year. This department became the first Bulgarian member of the International Organization of Computer Sciences (UPE).

=== Technical University of Varna ===
Technical University of Varna (Bulgarian: Технически университет Варна) has been the official name since 1995. The university has started new relationships with universities in other countries, including Greece and Belgium. In 1996, the sports complex on the campus was reconstructed. In 1997, the building of New Learning Housing (Bulgarian: Нов Учебен Корпус), one of the biggest buildings on campus, opened its doors. New courses of study were established at the university:

- Computer systems and technologies
- Robotics and mechatronics
- Renewables
- Ecology and environmental protection
- Telecommunications and mobile technologies

In 2002, MEI-Varna celebrated its 40th anniversary. A Meet-Marind congress was held, and participants from 27 countries gave reports. In the same year, the university had a team in the Shell Eco-marathon. In 2011, a new ship simulator was opened. In 2012, the Technical University of Varna celebrated fifty years, and as of this year, over 35,000 engineers have finished their higher education at the university.

== Structure ==
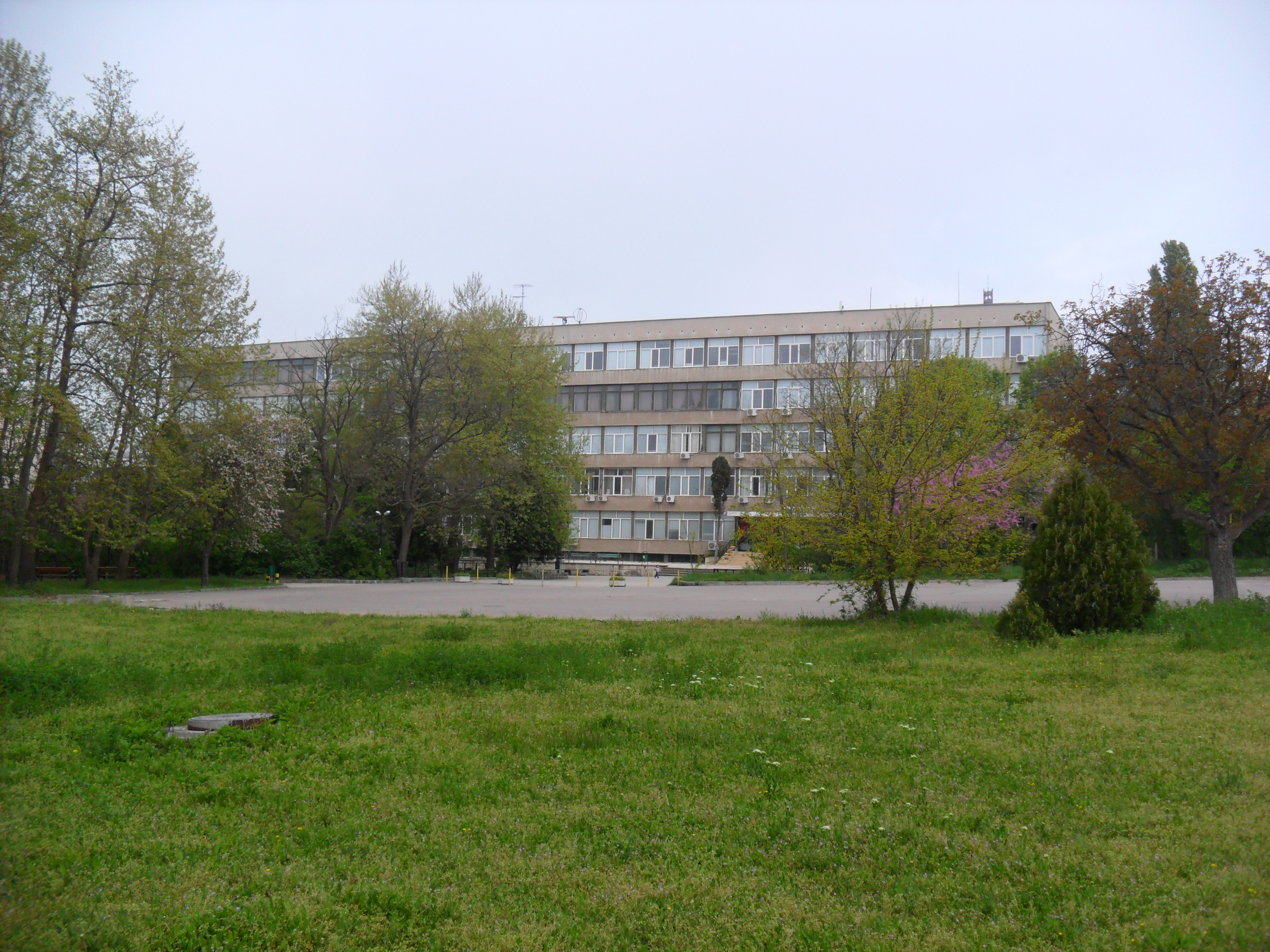
Building of Electrical faculty

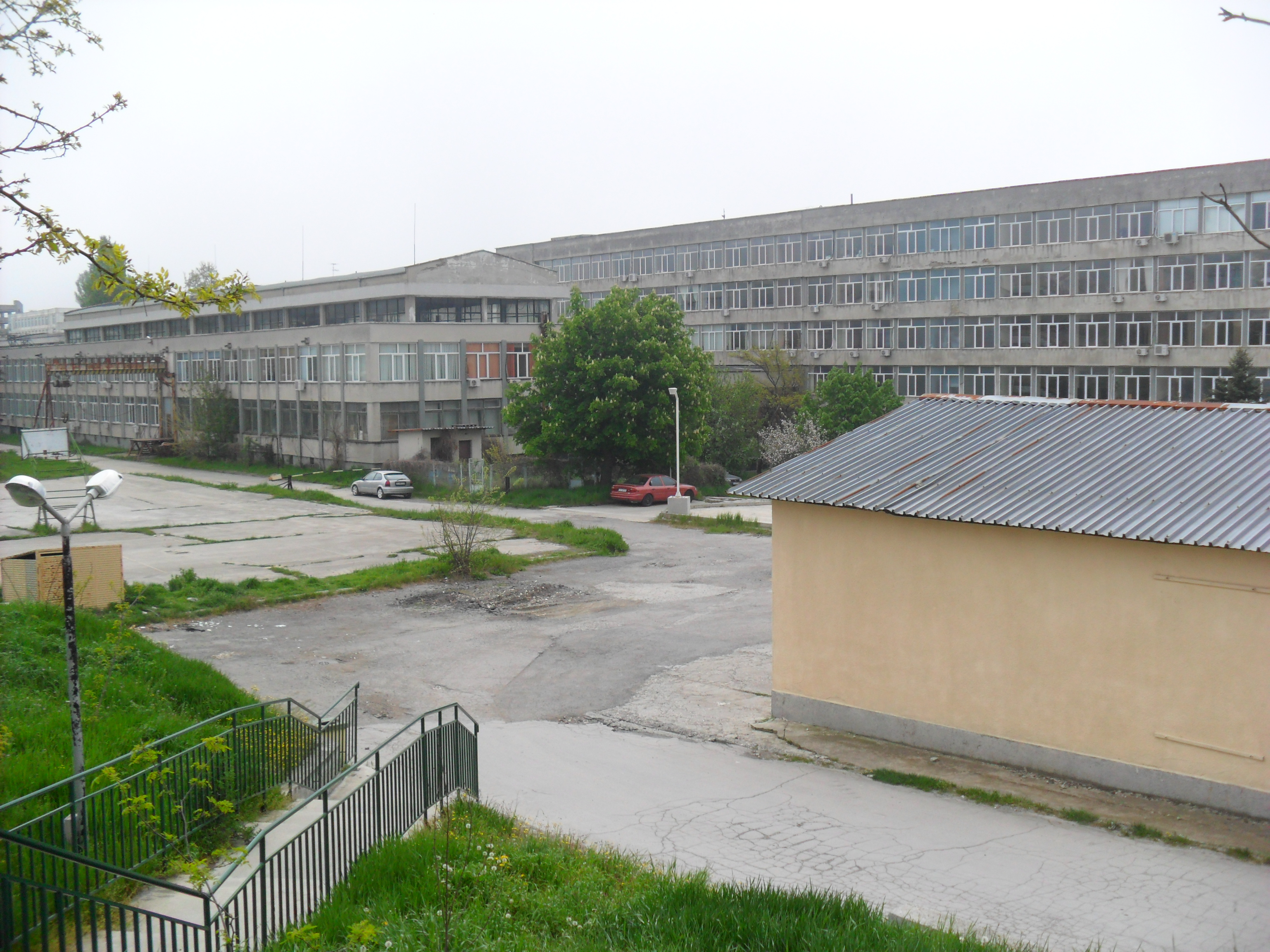
Building of Machine and Shipbuilding faculty

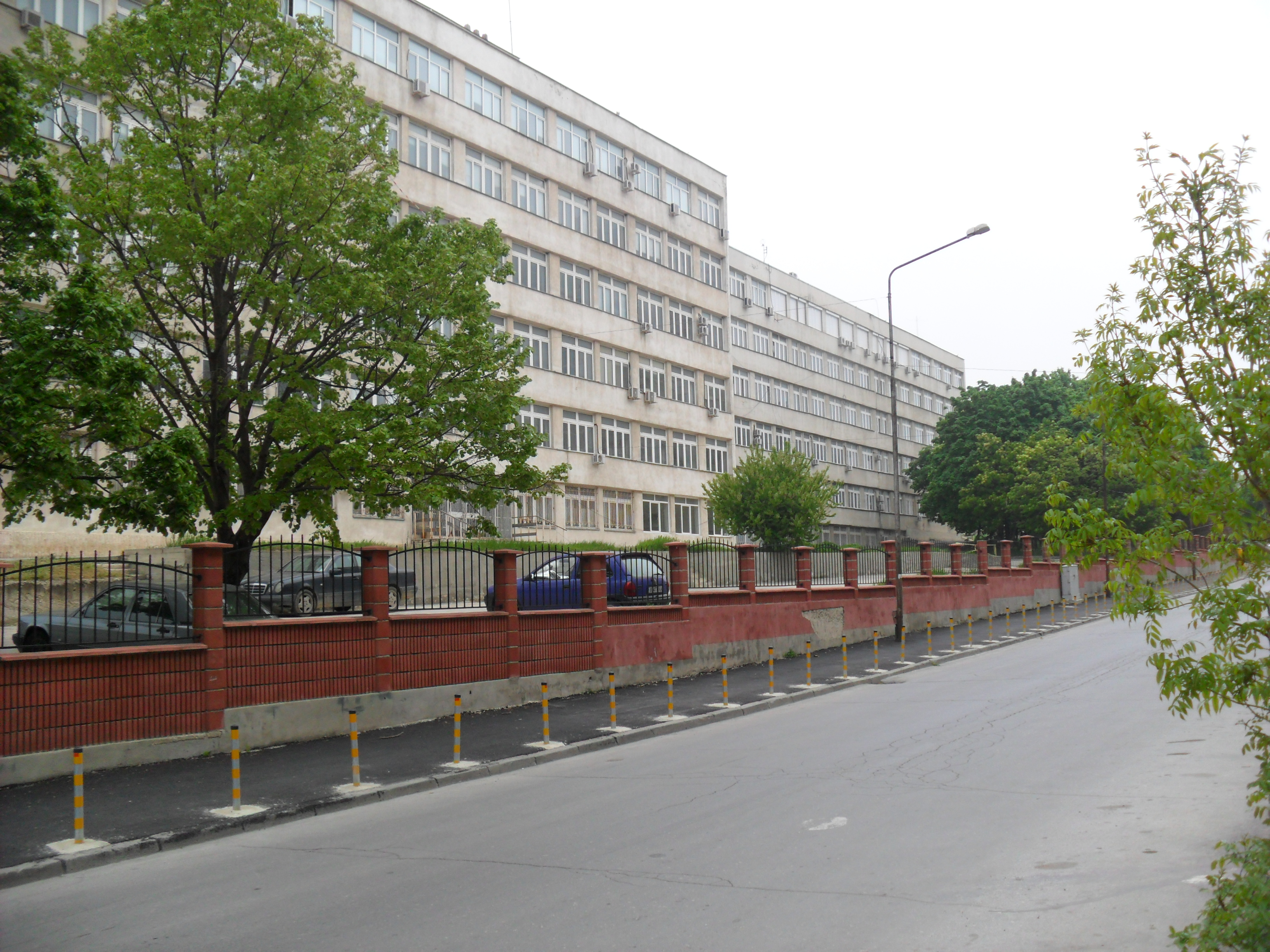
Building of New Learning Housing

=== Leadership ===
- Prof. Dr. Eng. Ventsislav Tsekov Valchev, Rector of the Technical University-Varna
- Assoc. Prof. Dr. Eng. Maria Ivanova Marinova, Vice-rector of Academic Affairs
- Assoc. Prof. Dr. Eng. Todor Dimitrov Ganchev, Vice-rector of Science and Applied Scientific Research
- Assoc. Prof. Dr. Eng. Kiril Yankov Kirov, Vice Rector "Academic Staff and Coordination"
- Prof. Dr. Eng. Rosalina Stefanova Dimova, Vice Rector "Internationalization"

=== Faculties ===
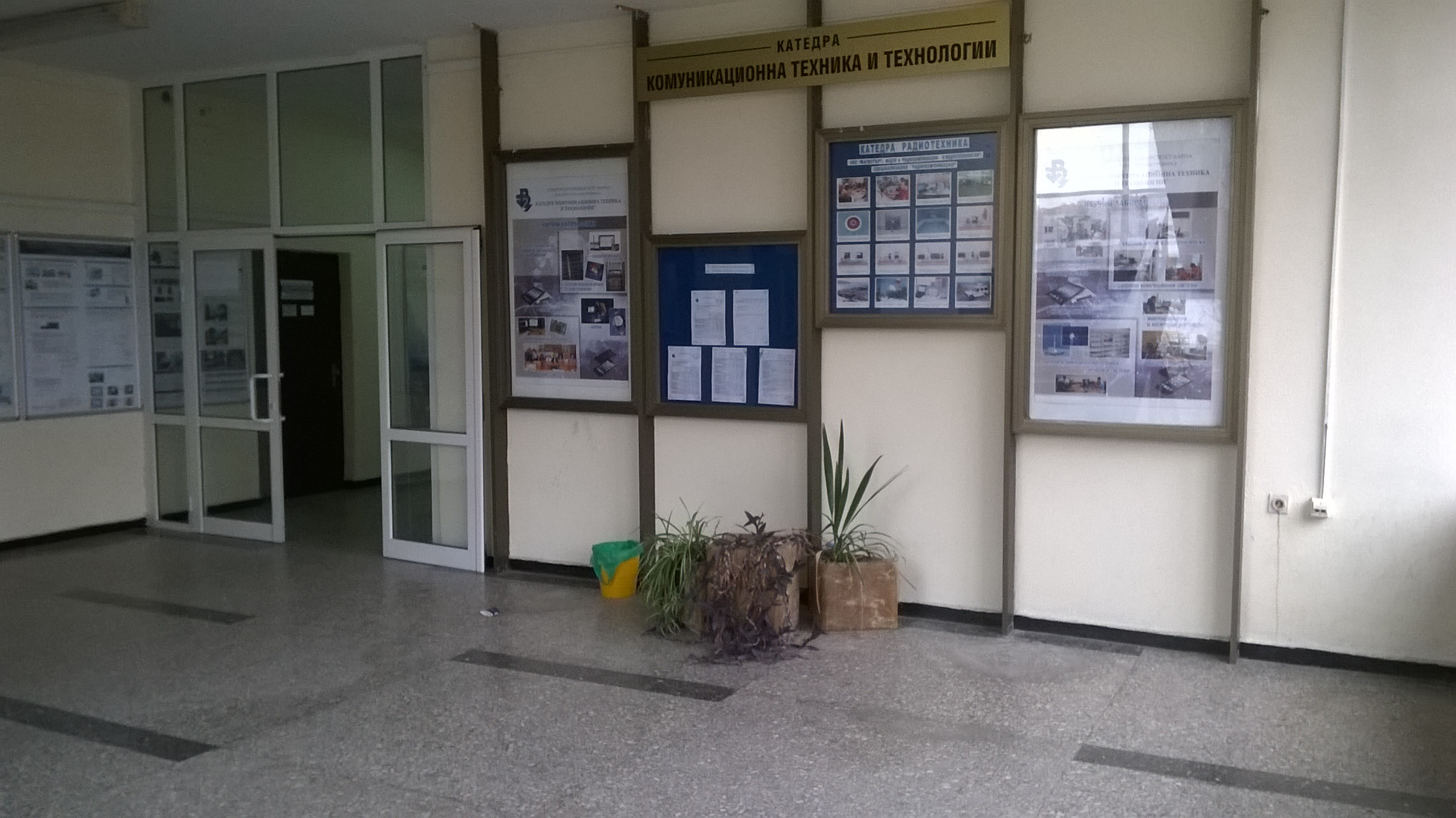
Faculty of Communications

- Faculty of Mechanical Engineering; Dean, Prof. Svetlana Lesidrenska
- Faculty of Electrical Engineering; Dean, Prof. Bohos Aprahamyan
- Faculty of Shipbuilding; Dean, Prof. Iliya Hadjidimov
- Faculty of Computing and Automation; Dean, Prof. Marinela Aleksandrova

=== Departments ===
- Naval Architecture and Marine Engineering
- Ecology and Environmental Protection
- Navigation, Transport Management and Waterways Preservation
- Physics
- Economics and Management

=== Component colleges ===
- Dobrudza Technological College - Dobrich
- College in the structure of the Technical University of Varna
- Department of Foreign Languages and Mathematics
- Foreign students Dean's office
- Chair of PhD Students

== Rectors of Technical University of Varna ==
- Prof. Marin Oprev (1963–1967)
- Prof. Petar Penchev (1967–1973)
- Prof. Lefter Lefterov (1973–1979)
- Prof. Emil Stanchev (1979–1985)
- Prof. Doncho Donchev (1985–1986)
- Prof. Dimitar Dimitrov (1986–1991)
- Prof. Asen Nedev (1991–1999)
- Prof. Stefan Badurov (1999–2007)
- Prof. Ovid Fahri (2007–2015)
- Prof. Rosen Vasilev (2015–2018)
- Prof. Rozalina Dimova (2018–2019)
- Prof. Ventzislav Valchev (2019–2023)
- Prof. Dragomir Plamenov (2023-)

== Doctor Honoris Causa ==
- Prof. Peter Apelt (1995)
- Hermann Scheer PhD (1997)
- Prof. Adrian Bejan (2006)
- Academic Yanko Arsov (2007)
- Prof. Vladimir Danov (2008)

== Honorary Professors of Technical University of Varna ==
- Prof. Lefter Lefterov (1982)
- Dr. Reinhard Pfligel (2002)
- Cap. Mark Duve (2002)
- Prof. Edward Somers (2002)
- Prof. Marcelo Santos Neves (2002)
- Prof. Mohammed Mosaad (2002)
- Prof. Giorgio Trinkas (2002)
- Dr. Maria Luisa Tenhunen (2002)
- Prof. Frank Zimmer (2002)
- Prof. Bernard King (2002)
- Dr. Reinhard Pfligel (2002)
- Prof. Edward Somers (2002)
- Prof. Jerzy Kubitski (2002)
- Prof. Nicolae piperidyl (2002)
- Prof. Marcelo Santos Neves (2002)
- Prof. Ivan Kostilev (2002)
- Prof. Mohammed Mosaad (2002)
- Prof. Masaki Mano (2002)
- Prof. Vladimir Alexandrov (2002)
- Prof. Vadim Vinokur (2002)
- Prof. Yasushi Yoshida (2002)
- Prof. Guedesh Carlos Soares (2003)
- Acad. Kiril Boyanov (2005)
- Prof. Alex van den Boshe (2005)
- Prof. Alexei Tadzhibaev (2005)
- Prof. Erdogan Tezich (2005)
- Prof. Nusret Aras (2005)
- Prof. Havar Mamedov (2005)
- Prof. Yolanda Angulo (2008)
- Prof. Dr. Eng. Evgeny Vatev Vatev (2012)
- Prof. Eng. Petar Penchev (2012)
- Prof. Eng. Dimitar Ivanov Dimitrov (2012)
- Assoc. Eng. Hristo Stoykov Handjiyski (2012)
- Prof. Eng. Marin Tzotchev Rachev (2012)
- Prof. Eng. Kontrov Sava Ivanov (2012)
- Prof. Dr. Eng. Marin Marinov Yordanov (2012)
- Prof. Dr. Eng. Ivan Vasilev Bakardjiev (2012)
- Prof. Eng. Marin Tzotchev Rachev (2012)
- Assoc. Dr. Eng. Dimitar Dimov Judah (2012)
- Assoc. Eng. Georgi Gerasimov Dishliev (2012)

== Library ==
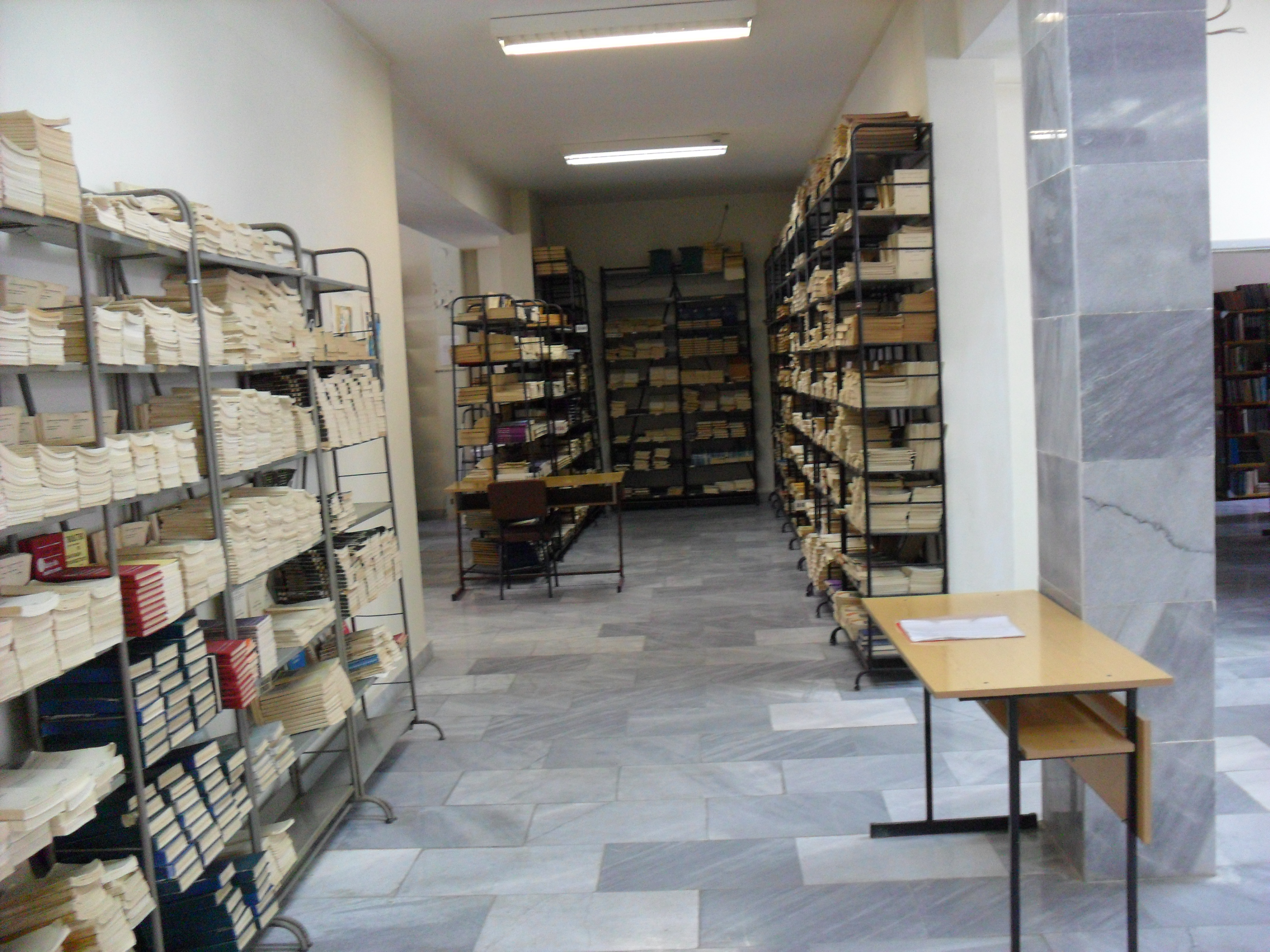
Old books in Library of Technical University of Varna

The library in the Technical University of Varna was founded in 1963. The first books and scientific materials were inherited from the Technical faculty. After 1968, the library was housed in the building of the Electrical faculty. The library includes books, scientific publications and technical atlases in Russian, Bulgarian, English, and other languages.

In 1973, the library had 35,336 volumes of technical literature. Starting in 1975, the library was housed in the Educational-Production Hall. In 1991, the library was updated with computer software called "Automated Library"; technical resources numbered 80,900 volumes. Since 1999, the library has been housed in the New Learning Housing. Technical resources number 200,010 volumes.

== High technology park ==
Founded in 2001, Technical University of Varna is the sole owner of the technology park. It was created for development of the technical resources of the university.

== Faculty buildings on campus ==
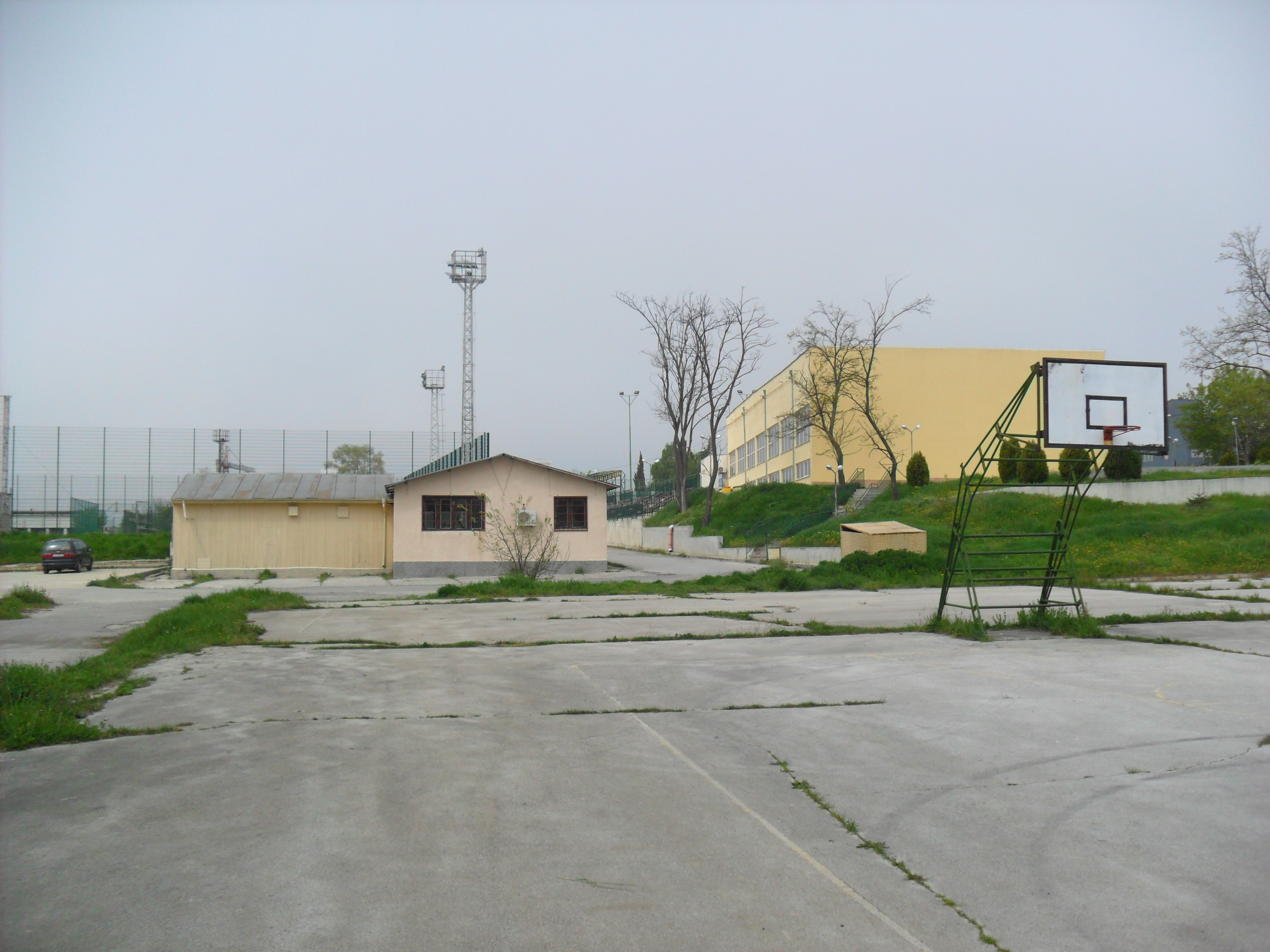
Sports complex, Technical University of Varna

- Machine Faculty Building (and rectorate)
- Electrical Faculty Building
- Learning Housing Building
- New Learning Housing Building
- Learning-Production Base Building

== International opportunities ==
- ERASMUS Programme

== Facts ==
- The Bulgarian painter of futuristic art, Stefan Lefterov, worked in the university until 1992, as a mathematician. He donated many of his paintings to his colleagues and to the university.

== See also ==
- List of universities in Bulgaria
- Varna
