= Swedish Defence Research Agency =

Swedish agency for total defence research

Coat of arms

The Swedish Defence Research Agency (Swedish: Totalförsvarets forskningsinstitut, FOI; literal translation: Total Defence Research Institute) is a government agency in Sweden for total defence research and development.

FOI has its headquarters in Kista (Stockholm). Other FOI offices or research centres are located in Grindsjön, Linköping, and Umeå.

== History ==
FOI was created in 2001 by combining the Swedish National Defence Research Institute (FOA) with the National Aeronautical Research Institute (FFA). The first of these agencies, FFA, had been created in 1940 in Bromma, Stockholm as a governmental research institute for the Swedish aviation industry, large parts of which were devoted to military aircraft. The second, FOA, had been created in 1945 from three existing organisations:

- The Swedish Armed Forces Chemical Institute (Försvarsväsendets kemiska anstalt, FKA), a government agency created in 1937 and located in Ursvik, Sundbyberg Municipality. FKA had predecessors in chemical warfare and chemical warfare protection activities conducted at Lund university from 1926 and Uppsala university from 1928.
- The Military Physics Institute (Militärfysiska institutet, MFI), a collaboration organisation between the Swedish universities' physics departments started in 1941 as an initiative to put modern physical knowledge at the disposal of Sweden's defence during World War II.
- A section of the Swedish Board of Inventions (Statens uppfinnarnämnd, SUN) concerned with radar experiments, created in 1942.

Soon after FOA's creation in 1945, the organisation was tasked with investigating the novel invention of nuclear weapons. This included protection activities and investigations, but also preparations for a possible Swedish nuclear weapon program. In the 1950s and 1960s, nuclear research constituted a considerable part of FOA's activities. After Sweden signed the Nuclear Non-Proliferation Treaty in 1968, the remaining nuclear development activities were dismantled, and only protection research remained in the nuclear area.

Initially, all FOA activities were located in the Stockholm region, but in the 1970s some parts were relocated to Karlstad, Linköping, and Umeå. In 2005, several of FOI's activities in the Stockholm region were consolidated at a common location in Kista.

When FOI was created in 2001 from FOA and FFA, the number of employees stood at around 1,300. In the early 2000s, activities at FOI were scaled back as a cost-saving measure. In 2007, the number of employees had been reduced to around 1,000, where it has remained.

== FOI funding and staff ==
The institute is organised under the Swedish Ministry of Defence, which provides a large part of its budget. FOI also receives funding from other Swedish government institutions and, to a lesser extent, from the EU. FOI also conducts research commissioned by private customers on commercial terms, including outside Sweden. In 2019, FOI had a budget of approximately 1.25 billion SEK.

In 2019, FOI employed 983 people, including "scientists, social scientists, economists, legal practitioners, and philosophers". One third of employees were women. 39 percent of employees, excluding supporting staff, held doctoral degrees. The average age was 46 years old for both sexes.

== FOI research areas ==
The activities of FOI include research, development of technology, and analysis, primarily for military defence, but also for civil emergencies, natural disasters, security, and other civilian applications. FOI also studies security policy, conflicts, and international affairs. According to its website, FOI is organised into five sections, four of which engage in research and one that provides administrative support:

- C4ISR: This section researches technologies and systems of command, control, communications, computers, intelligence, surveillance and reconnaissance. This includes radar and optronic sensors as well as communication networks, artificial intelligence, information security, etc.
- CBRN Defence and Security: This section studies the properties of chemical, biological, radioactive, and nuclear materials, as well as incidents and warfare involving such materials and how to protect against them.
- Defence and Security, Systems and Technology: This section researches issues related to technology and weaponry, including aeronautics, underwater sonars, jet propulsion, missile technology, nuclear weapons and arms control, ballistic protection, etc.
- Defence Analysis: This section studies crisis management, conflicts, international security, and strategy, with research projects devoted to topics of a geographic (Russia, Arctic, Africa, etc.) or thematic (international missions, defence economy, etc.) nature.
- Research Support and Administration: This section offers administration, leadership, and support for FOI's research divisions.

FOI reports are published online or in print, in Swedish and/or in English.

== Directors-General ==
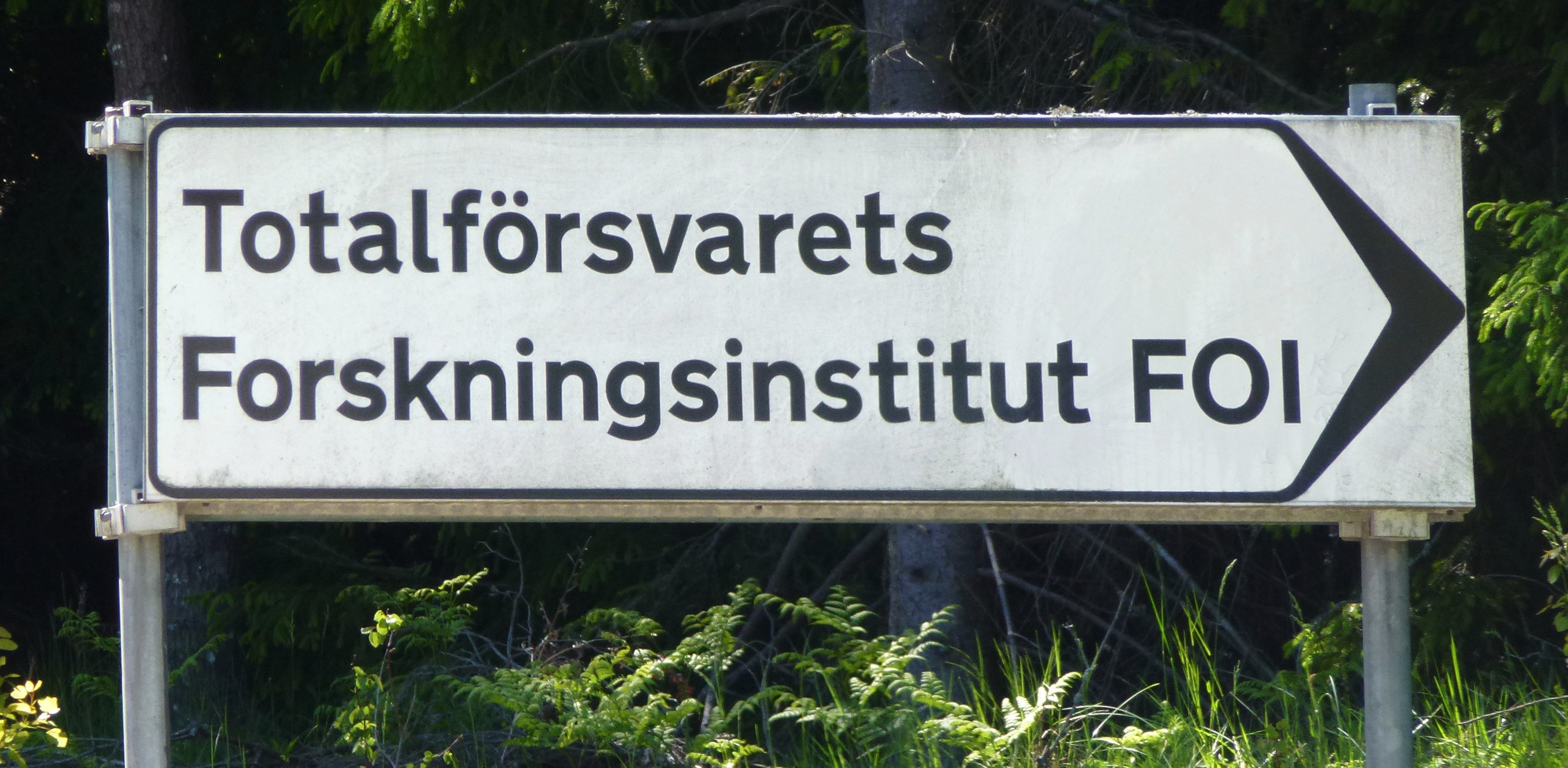
Road sign near Grindsjön

- 1 January 2001 – 30 August 2003: Bengt Anderberg (FOA director-general since 1994)
- 1 September 2003 – 30 March 2009: Madelene Sandström
- 1 April 2009 – 24 January 2019: Jan-Olof Lind
- 25 January 2019 – 11 August 2019: Anna-Lena Österborg (temporary)
- 12 August 2019–: Jens Mattsson

== See also ==
- Defence Materiel Administration (FMV)
- FOA camouflage
- Government agencies in Sweden
- Project Simoom
- Swedish Defence University

=== Similar organizations ===
- Agency for Defense Development - South Korea
- Defense Advanced Research Projects Agency - United States
- Defence Industry Agency - Turkey
- Defence Research and Development Organisation - India
- Defence Technology Institute - Thailand
- Military Institute of Armament Technology - Poland
- National Chung-Shan Institute of Science and Technology - Taiwan
