= Swedish nuclear weapons program =

Kingdom of Sweden
- Nuclear program start date: 1945
- First nuclear weapon test: None
- First thermonuclear weapon test: None
- Last nuclear test: None
- Largest yield test: None
- Total tests: None
- Peak stockpile: None
- Current stockpile: None; the program was ended in 1972.
- Deployed warheads: None
- Total deployed warhead megatonnage: None
- Maximum missile range: 70 km (Robot 08)
- NPT party: Yes
- Related institutions: Swedish National Defence Research Institute

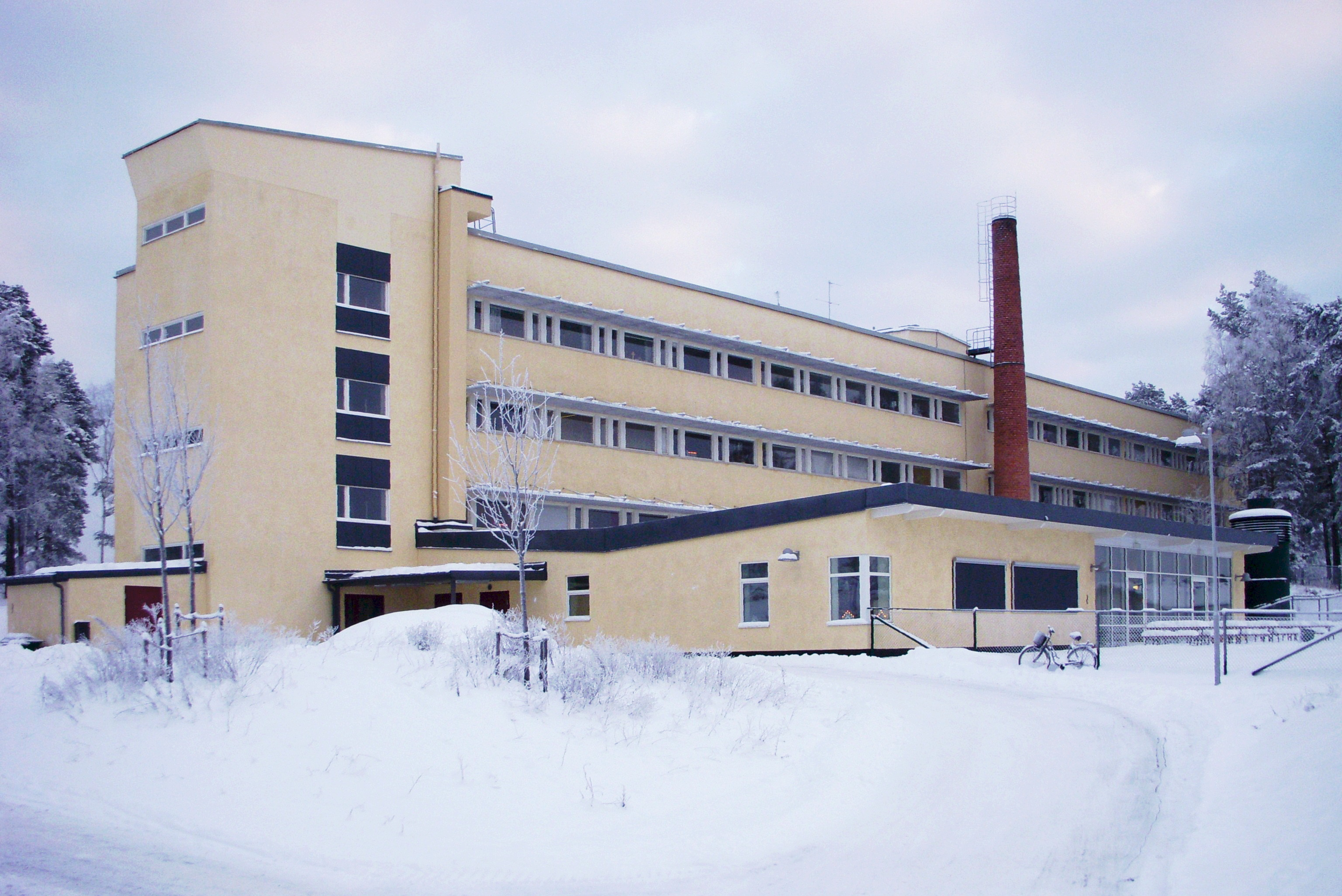
FOA's old building in Ursvik, Sundbyberg. This building is now a school.

After World War II, Sweden considered building nuclear weapons to defend themselves against an offensive assault from the Soviet Union. From 1945 to 1972 the government ran a clandestine nuclear weapons program under the guise of civilian defence research at the Swedish National Defence Research Institute (FOA).

By the late 1950s the work had reached the point where underground testing was feasible. However, at this time the Riksdag prohibited research and development of nuclear weapons, pledging that research should be done only for the purpose of defence against nuclear attack. They reserved the right to continue development of offensive weapons in the future.

In recent years declassified documents have shown that Sweden was much closer to possessing the nuclear bomb than previously thought. By 1965 most of the bomb was already built and another 6 months would have been needed to arm it, had the project been given the green light. Another two bombs would have been built shortly thereafter.

The option to continue development of weapons was abandoned in 1966, and Sweden's subsequent signing of the Non-Proliferation Treaty (NPT) in 1968 began the wind-down of the program, which finally concluded in 1972. Sweden was strongly influenced to abandon its nuclear weapons program by the United States.

== Background ==
During the final phase of World War II, the Swedish Government saw value in the future of nuclear energy, especially the Allied interest in Sweden's uranium-bearing black shale deposits. This led to suggestions that Sweden should establish state control over its natural resources, including uranium. Specifically, such controls would include export controls on uranium in collaboration with the American and British governments, exclusive Swedish controls over uranium ore, and a ban on commercial mining of uranium.

Through its advisors, including Manne Siegbahn among others, the government realized the link between its ore and nuclear weapons. After American Ambassador Herschel Johnson brought up that question in a conversation with State Secretary for Foreign Affairs Stig Sahlin on 27 July 1945, the issue was raised at the government meeting on 2 August. On 11 September, Sweden committed itself to establish state control over mining and export of uranium. Sweden rejected the American suggestion of a right to purchase Swedish uranium as well as a right to veto proposed Swedish uranium exports.

The opening of the Cold War and fears of an attack by the Soviet Union led to increasing interest in Sweden possessing its own nuclear arsenal. They were only interested in tactical nuclear weapons that would be used in a defensive role on Swedish territory or nearby seas. For reasons not directly related to security, Sweden never considered strategic nuclear weapons that could reach the Soviet Union. British and U.S. ideas heavily influenced the Swedish Armed Forces’ doctrinal thinking at that time.

== Early studies ==
Physics-oriented defence research started in Sweden during World War II, and drew many outstanding Swedish physicists to the Military Institute of Physics (MFI) founded in 1941. Here the focus was on conventional weapons. In 1945, MFI merged with two other organizations to form the Swedish National Defence Research Institute (FOA) in compliance with a 1944 proposal to reorganize the Swedish defence research. Research at the FOA was focused on such things as jet engines, rocket technology, shaped charge systems, and radars.

In August 1945, just a few days after the Hiroshima bombing, Sweden's Supreme Commander of the Armed Forces, Helge Jung, made a request via newly appointed research officer Torsten Schmidt that the recently founded FOA should find out what was known about those new weapons. FOA's first report to the Supreme Commander in late 1945 was largely based on the Smyth Report, the official US report on Manhattan Project and physics behind it, which was published on 12 August.

== Connection between nuclear weapons program and civilian use of nuclear energy ==
As soon as nuclear bombs became known, both nuclear weapons and nuclear energy drew significant attention in many countries. Immediately after the Smyth Report came out, discussions around peaceful use of nuclear energy in the US began.

Studies of military and civilian use of nuclear energy started in Sweden even before the end of 1945. In November 1945, the Atomic Committee (Atomkommittén, AC) was founded. AC was an advisory committee of experts with the mission to work out a defence plan and outline the alternative pathways for the development of civilian nuclear program (nuclear energy). In 1947, the government established the atomic energy company AB Atomenergi, 57 percent owned by the Government and the remaining 43 percent owned by a number of private companies active in the mining, steel and manufacturing industries. The company's task was to develop civilian nuclear power.

Even though much of the military research was kept in secret, it seems that the connection between the military and civilian projects initially was not controversial, and necessary because of the lack of available resources and expertise. AB Atomenergi had a close relationship with FOA from the start, and signed a co-operation agreement in 1948. The FOA had already established a research area south of Stockholm (FOA Grindsjön) that became the epicentre for military research and development (R&D). Thus, the Swedish nuclear program emerged as a joint government-business venture quite distinct from other nuclear weapon programs - traditionally solely state-run. When the anti-nuclear weapons movement began to gain influence during the late 1950s and became stronger during the 1960s, the connection between military and civilian nuclear research became viewed with suspicion.

== Beginning of the nuclear program ==
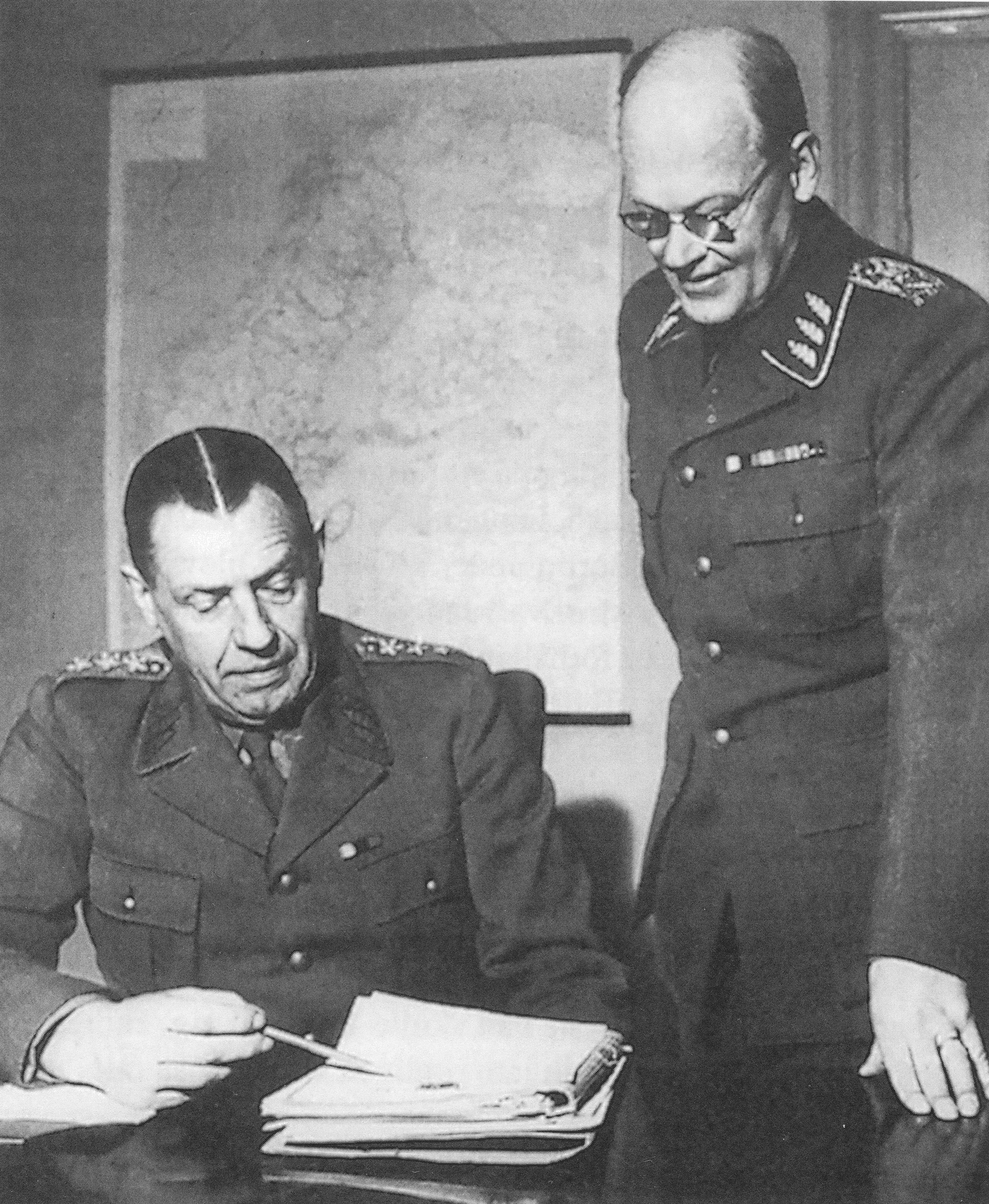
Supreme Commander of the Swedish Armed Forces Nils Swedlund and Chief of Staff Richard Åkerman on their first day in office on April 1, 1951

Timeline of the Swedish nuclear weapons program
Year	Event
1945	The United States tries to gain a monopoly over Swedish uranium assets. Atomic bombs are dropped over Hiroshima and Nagasaki. National Defence Research Institute (FOA) is assigned to conduct investigative mission, to collect the existing data on the nuclear issue. Atomic Commission is founded.
1947	AB Atomenergi is founded.
1948	FOA is assigned to explore the possibilities for nuclear weapons acquisition in Sweden - the actual start of the nuclear weapons program.
1952	Air Force Chief Bengt Nordenskiöld makes public statement on Swedish nuclear weapons.
1953	The United States launches the Atoms for Peace program.
1954	Report by the Commander-in-Chief takes a formal position on nuclear weapons. The first Swedish reactor R1 is set in operation. The first Swedish contemplations about whether to purchase nuclear weapons from the US.
1955	The first detailed drafts of Swedish nuclear warhead are completed. The Social Democratic government proves to be divided over the nuclear question. Sweden and US conclude the first cooperation agreement on civilian nuclear energy.
1956	A government report suggests that Sweden invests in nuclear energy based on the domestic fuel cycle, the so-called “Swedish line.”
1957	Report by the Commander-in-Chief features a clear position on Swedish nuclear weapons. The public debate on nuclear weapons takes off. AB Atomenergi purchases American materials for the Ågesta site to accelerate the civilian nuclear energy program. However, guarantees that it would not be used for nuclear weapons purposes hamper plutonium supplies for the nuclear weapons program. Swedish contemplations at ambassador's level over the opportunity to purchase nuclear weapons from the United States.
1958	FOA presents two alternative research programs: defense research (S-program) and nuclear explosive devices research (L-program). First studies of solely military reactors are presented – to insure the plutonium production. Commander-in-Chief in his annual defense budget report calls on the Government to officially choose the L-program although the Minister of Defense advised against it because of the serious split in the Social Democratic party. Government rejects the request for the L-program, but recommends funding of S-program under another scheme. The parliament approves this decision.
1959	A working group with the Social Democratic Party offers a compromise in the form of enhanced defense research with preservation of the freedom of action.
1960	The Social Democratic Party Congress accepts the offer of compromise, and the Government issues directives with the suggested conditions. The United States decides neither to sell nuclear weapons to Sweden nor to support Swedish domestic nuclear development. Due to the problems with plutonium supply, the cost estimates for Swedish nuclear weapons acquisition increase remarkably.
1961	Nils Swedlund's retirement is followed by the first skeptical views on Swedish nuclear weapons acquisition within the Swedish Ministry of Defense.
1962	The Commander-in-Chief's 1962 report is still in favor of Swedish nuclear weapons, yet not as pronounced as the 1957 report. Sweden begins to take an active stance in the international negotiations on non-proliferation. The Comprehensive Test Ban Treaty is established.
1965	The 1965 report supports the initiative of Swedish nuclear weapons, but does not contain any concrete proposals on their implementation.
1966	Sweden abandons the freedom of action doctrine, and begins pushing for a non-proliferation agreement.
1967	Sweden begins phasing-out nuclear weapons research.
1968	Sweden ratifies the NPT and terminates its nuclear research with the exception of actual defense research.
1972	Termination of nuclear program is complete as the plutonium laboratory is shut down.
1974	Ågesta reactor is permanently shut down.
2012	3.3 kg plutonium and 9 kg of uranium are exported to the US as part of the Global Threat Reduction Initiative.

In October 1945, FOA made a request for additional funding for studies of nuclear weapons. The funding was eventually granted. Beginning in 1946, Sweden quickly established a well-organized and well-funded nuclear weapons research program (under guise of "civilian defence research") divided into five distinct areas: research, plutonium production, construction funding for reactors and enrichment facilities, acquisition of delivery systems, and testing and assembly of nuclear weapons. The Department of Nuclear Physics was founded in early 1946 within FOA's department of Physics (FOA 2), and by mid-1946 there were about 20 FOA-researchers and similar number of external researchers engaged in research on nuclear weapons or nuclear energy. Sweden found itself in a favorable position as it was, and still is, very rich in natural uranium. However, the ore grade is quite low (mostly shale), and therefore requires extensive mining and milling. The natural uranium was subsequently supposed to be reprocessed and used as a fuel in the reactors (plutonium recycling).

In 1947, AB Atomenergi (AE) was founded under initiative of the Atom Committee with the goal of building experimental reactors and developing methods to extract uranium from low-grade Swedish deposits for both civilian and military needs. Since 1948, a division of functions occurred between FOA and AB Atomenergi. AE focused on developing methods to separate plutonium from uranium and fission products (reprocessing) in order to allow the plutonium to be used as fuel in the reactors (plutonium recycling). This procedure would enable a more efficient use of the natural uranium. While FOA's uranium activities were carried out, a collaboration agreement was drawn up (with final approval by the Government in 1950) to make sure that military research could benefit from the recently launched civilian nuclear activities.

The actual start of the nuclear weapons program occurred in 1948. In February, the FOA's board decided to turn defence research toward work on nuclear weapons, perhaps because of the divisions that occurred between FOA and AB Atomenergi. Only a few days after the decision, the Supreme Commander, Nils Swedlund, assigned the FOA to explore possibilities for Sweden to acquire nuclear weapons. The exploration was carried out quickly, and on 4 May 1948, the report was finalized with Gustaf Ljunggren (Chief of FOA 1, Department of Chemistry) and Torsten Magnusson (Chief of FOA 2) as signatories. Central in the investigation was that they advocated for investing in nuclear weapons based on plutonium rather than on highly enriched uranium (U-235) since the uranium option turned out to be technically more difficult. The investigation also included a summarized plan for a Swedish nuclear weapons project with primary estimates of time and expenses. According to the report, the time framework was determined by the installation of reactors, mining of the raw material for them and production of plutonium in the reactors rather than the construction of the nuclear weapon itself. The contributing factor for this estimate was the misestimated critical mass of a plutonium pit, believing it to be 20–50 kg instead of the actual 6 kg.

== Basic materials ==
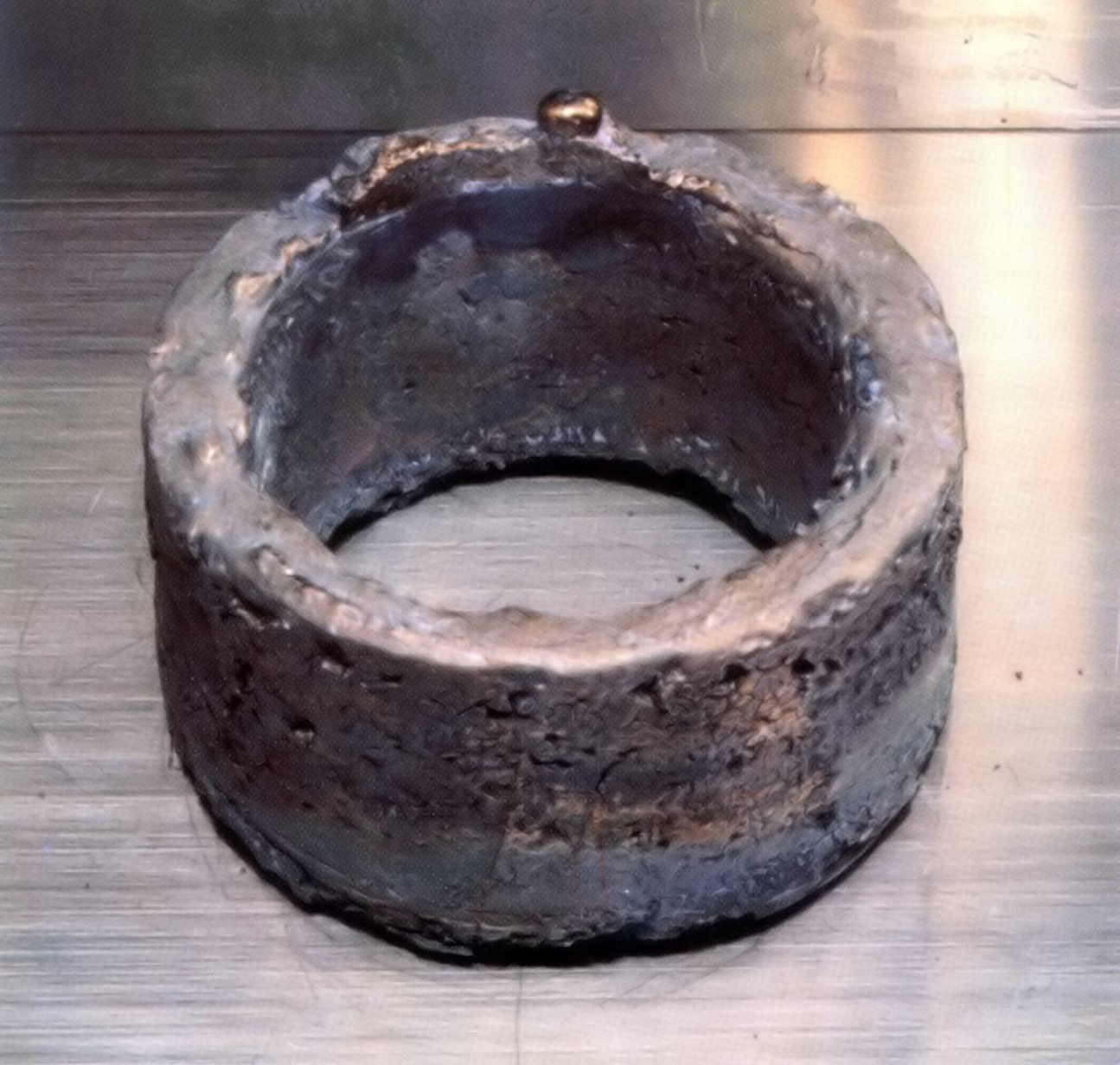
Plutonium ring

In order to create the plutonium needed for nuclear weapons, the plan was to run heavy water reactors where uranium would be turned into plutonium-239 (Pu-239). The basic materials needed in large amounts included, uranium, heavy water, and graphite, materials hard to obtain because of American export controls established to prevent other countries from acquiring nuclear weapons. Significant amounts of uranium existed as admixture in the Swedish black shale deposits that had already been used during WWII by Swedish shale oil companies to produce fuel, whose strategic value was first realized following Allied propositions. Ranstad was projected to be a major source of uranium.

Under secrecy, Sweden purchased five tons of heavy water from Norway. Later, they planned to produce heavy water at a plant in Ljungaverk. Acquisition of graphite was thought to be straightforward. Access to the required amount of plutonium remained the key technological question throughout the entire Swedish nuclear weapons program.

Already in Autumn 1948, criticism came out in a joint statement by AB Atomenergi and Atom Commission. The FOA reports predicted a military monopoly over Swedish uranium resources to the detriment of civilian research, and that much larger resources were being assigned to plutonium production. The feasibility of the plutonium project was under question. That was the first sign of antagonism of interests between military and civilian nuclear proponents. The plans had been predicated on the idea that each nuclear device required 50 kg rather than 6 kg of plutonium. None of those involved in the project realized that this was, in fact, an overestimation. Although the program was scaled to produce 5-10 weapons per year, given the estimated production of 1 kg of Pu-239 per day, it was actually scaled to produce sixty.

== 1950s: The Government favors nuclear program ==
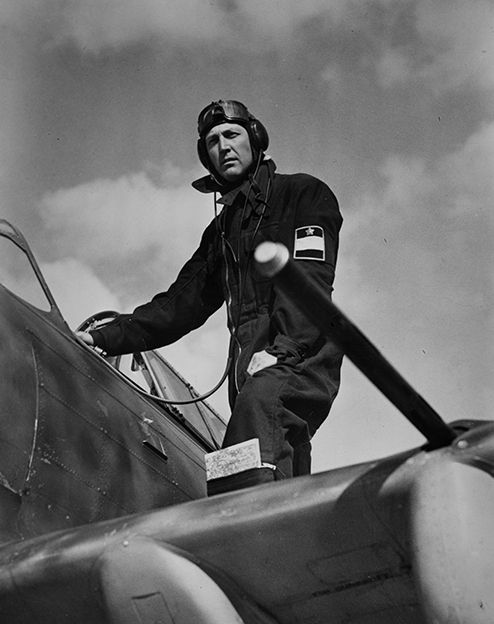
Bengt Nordenskiöld, 1941

In the early 1950s, the rivalry between the United States and the USSR accelerated markedly. Nuclear arms production proliferation increased as significantly as the Soviet Union exploded its first nuclear bomb in 1949, and in 1953, their first hydrogen bomb. The Korean War broke out and the US adopted the strategy of massive retaliation following any use of nuclear weapons. This policy boosted the strategic value of Scandinavia as a potential location for strategic bombers within striking distance of the USSR.

In 1952, Air Force Chief Bengt Nordenskiöld proposed that Sweden should move beyond the defensive research on nuclear weapons and their effects. FOA researched the potential acquisition of nuclear weapons. In 1954, Nils Swedlund, Supreme Commander of the Swedish Armed Forces, publicly declared that nuclear weapons were crucial for the country's national security. The 1954 report discussed new kinds of weapons including autonomous weapons, electronic warfare, and NBC (Nuclear/Biological/Chemical) weapons. Swedlund wrote in the preface to the report that Sweden needed protection and countermeasures against those new weapons, and needed to acquire the most appropriate and feasible ones for Sweden itself. It was also emphasized that Sweden's nonaligned status implied that Sweden, unlike neighboring NATO-members, Denmark and Norway, did not benefit from any nuclear weapons guarantees from a superpower. In his assessment, Sweden's position between two superpowers and the rapidly changing technological environment, argued for Swedish possession of nuclear weapons. Although the Defence Ministry and Supreme Commander avoided laying out any concrete plans for nuclear weapons acquisition in the 1954 report, even Sweden's official military publications were openly advocating nuclear armament. Although two years earlier, Air Force Chief Bengt Nordenskiöld had already advocated for Swedish possession of nuclear weapons, his comments were understood to be personal opinion and did not stoke much debate at the time.

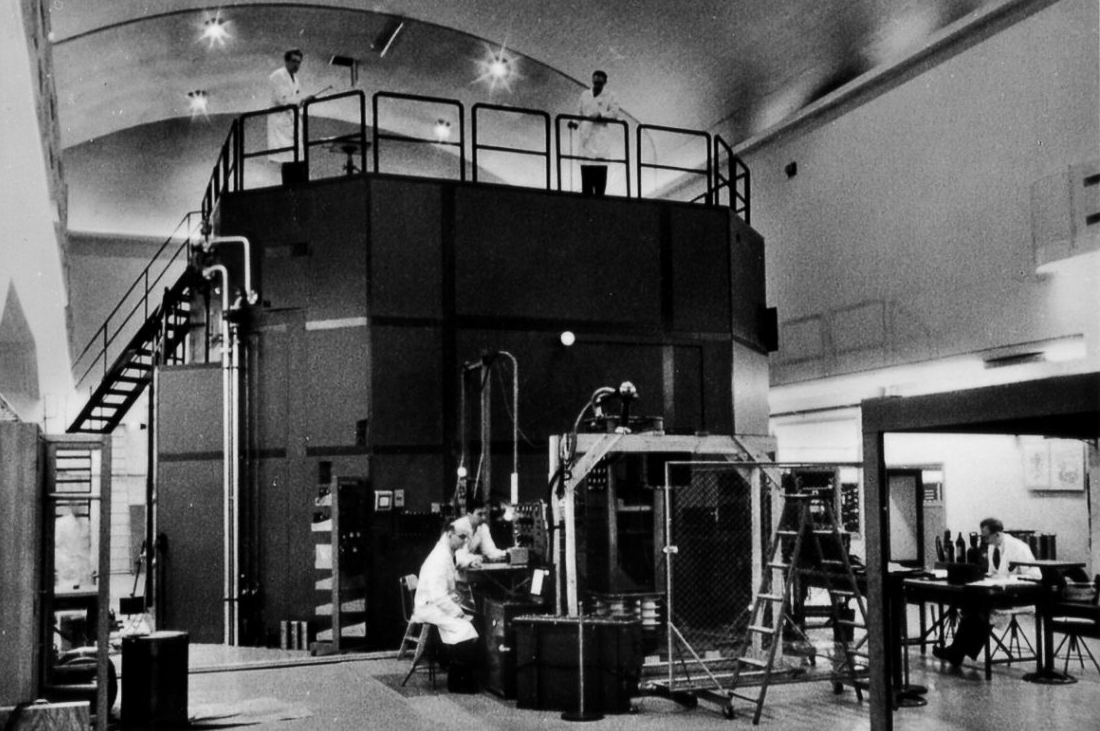
The R1 nuclear reactor below the Royal Institute of Technology in Stockholm, Sweden.

The Swedish parliament decided to carry out the heavy water program aimed at producing reactors loaded with natural uranium. The program was called den svenska linjen ("the Swedish line"), and was one of the largest industrial projects in Swedish history. Another feature of the Sweden's nuclear policy was that the program remain mostly under state control.

The "Swedish line" included the following design principles: to use natural uranium as fuel since Sweden had an abundant stock of uranium; to use heavy water instead of light water as a moderator; to be able to refuel the reactor so that the used fuel can be replaced by the Plutonium isotope composition at certain phase of the process.

The first Swedish nuclear reactor, R1, was started in 1951 and it was placed in a dug out cavern below the Royal Institute of Technology in Stockholm. It was a small experimental reactor with a thermal power of 1 MW. The purpose of R1 was not to produce power or plutonium but to gain insight into reactor physics. Also, the uranium extraction site in Kvarntorp reached its intended production capacity. In 1953, the Swedish scientists realized that the critical mass for the plutonium fueled nuclear weapons had been overestimated and the figure was reduced down to 5–10 kg in a report by Sigvard Eklund, which meant that the production requirement for plutonium was significantly less than it was earlier anticipated. In 1955, FOA concluded that Sweden would be able to produce nuclear weapons once it had a plutonium reactor.

In 1956 a second reactor, R2, was bought from the United States under bilateral safeguards. A third reactor, better known as Ågesta, was designed as a dual-use facility to produce electricity and a small amount of plutonium in a crisis. In 1957, FOA suggested using Ågesta to produce a small number of weapons quickly. A fourth power reactor, Marviken, was set to produce larger quantities of nuclear fuel for an arsenal of 100 weapons. In May 1957, the Supreme Commander gave FOA the task of carrying out a new study of the possibilities to produce nuclear weapons focused on the plutonium option. Marviken was located approximately 150 km away from Stockholm. Initially it was designed as 100 MW pressurized heavy water reactor that had a secondary circuit, where steam is produced from plain water. In the meantime, parallel to the pressurized reactor, a larger and more complicated design of reactor was under way. The alternative construction included superheating mechanism, internal reshuffling machine, and a complex process of boiling water, which ultimately complicated design and raised serious concerns.

At a Government meeting in November 1955, the question about acquiring nuclear weapons by Sweden was raised for the first time. The opposition Conservative Party called for procurement of nuclear weapons, raising the public salience of the issue. In the 1955 polls, the majority of the Swedish population, the ruling Social Democrats, and the armed services voted in favor of a Sweden armed with nuclear weapons. The Social Democrats were ambivalent: the majority was skeptical about the nuclear weapons program, whereas their leader and the then Prime Minister Tage Erlander leaned toward the nuclear option. The split in the ruling party became public knowledge. In 1956, an anti-nuclear faction of the party made it clear that they would not support the acquisition of nuclear weapons. As the party's crisis deepened in 1957, the majority of Social Democrats and the electorate apparently favored going nuclear. In 1957, the Supreme Commander in his report took an official position on the acquisition of tactical nuclear weapons by Sweden. That same year, the FOA (upon the Chief's request) undertook a detailed study of what would be needed to develop Swedish plutonium-based nuclear devices with estimates for timeframe and costs. Much was related to studies of plutonium and its properties, research that required very complex and highly protected facilities because of plutonium's many hazards.

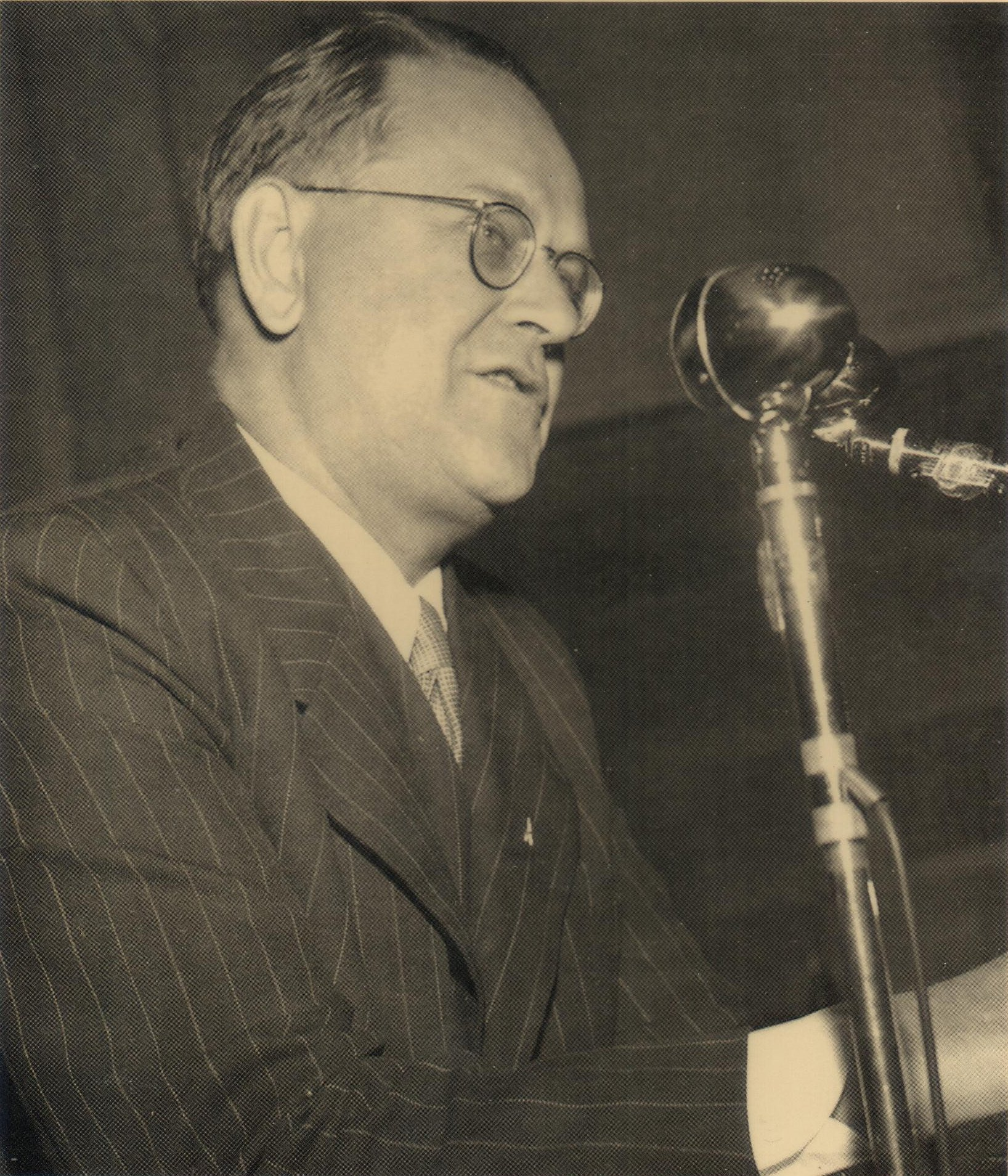
Tage Erlander 1952

The official position taken by Swedlund in 1957 brought the nuclear question into the realm of public policy debates in Sweden. Initially, the center-right politicians and the media were mostly positive while the social democrats were largely split. During the events that followed, the Government tried again to avoid taking an explicit position despite the fact that the defence position was laid out based on the Swedlund's position from 1957 and tensions were increasing globally. The pragmatic solution was to not directly invest into the development of Swedish nuclear weapons, but to provide increased funding for defence research in nuclear weapons, and to give the term "nuclear weapons" a very broad interpretation.

== Nuclear resistance begins ==
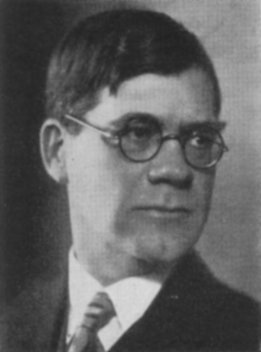
Östen Undén

The United States was concerned with the prospect of a nuclear Sweden, which jeopardized the world with further nuclear proliferation. In 1956, the United States and Sweden signed an agreement on civilian nuclear energy cooperation. The two parties agreed to exchange information regarding the construction, operation and development of research reactors. The Swedish government committed itself to providing the AEC with information regarding nuclear energy developments in Sweden. The deal also implied that the US nuclear umbrella would protect Sweden, and so there was no need for any nuclear arms. In May 1956, the National Federation of Social Democratic Women in Sweden took a stand against nuclear weapons, which heretofore had not been a major public issue in Sweden. Swedlund's position became the focal point for an intense debate in the media during 1957. The FOA's chief director, Hugo Larsson, also helped to energize the debate with an interview in Dagens Eko in 1957, in which he said that Sweden had the resources to build nuclear weapons, which could be completed in 1963–1964. Among the proponents of Swedish nuclear weapons program was Dagens Nyheter's chief editor, Herbert Tingsten, and former Social Democratic Defence Minister Per Edvin Sköld. Even the prospective leader of the Liberal People's Party, Per Ahlmark, was an advocate of Swedish nuclear weapons. Many of opponents of Swedish nuclear weapons development were found on the cultural left. The nuclear weapons issue would appear frequently in the press cultural pages. Meanwhile, among the opponents were Inga Thorsson, Ernst Wigforss, and Östen Unden. The editor of Folket i Bild, Per Anders Fogelström, advocated against Swedish nuclear weapons in the magazine, and published a book "Instead of the Atomic Bomb" together with Social Democratic student politician, Roland Morell. In 1957, they launched a petition against Swedish nuclear weapons, that was signed by 95,000 people and was handed over to Tage Erlander in February 1958.

The polls from the 1960s also reflected rising public indignation with the nuclear weapons program. A grass-root movement - "Aktionsgruppen mot svenska atomvapen", AMSA (the Action Group Against Swedish Atomic Bombs) - was founded in the late 1950s, and became very successful in its struggle against Swedish nuclear weapon intentions. Being a member of the U.N. Security Council, Sweden advanced a proposal for a nuclear test moratorium in 1957. "The international disarmament discussions and the nonproliferation norms emerging from the mid-1950s onwards and leading in 1968 to the NPT also affected the Swedish public debate and strengthened the arguments against Swedish nuclear weapons acquisition."

== Defence research and design research ==
In July 1958, the FOA laid out two different research programs: - "S-program" under the title "Research for Protection and Defence Against Atomic Weapons." - “L-program” entitled “Research for Preparation of Data for the Design of Nuclear Explosive Devices." The draft of the L-program was in essence an update of the data collected for the Supreme Commander a year earlier. The S-program, that emerged now for the first time, was described as a program to develop the knowledge about nuclear weapons which required the creation of Swedish defensive doctrine without nuclear weapons, which would be adopted to fight a war in which a nuclear strike could occur. Despite a completely different description of the purpose, the S-program included similar activities as the L-program, except it was stripped-down to around 75% of the cost. The S-program fit both the Chief's goal to acquire nuclear weapons and the Social Democratic Government's ambivalence, which the FOA under its new chief director, Martin Fehrm, had apparently realized. Thus, with such a proposition, the Government could fund almost all research activities necessary to pursue the Swedish nuclear weapons program, yet it asserted not to do so.

Regardless of the S-program's design, Swedlund decided to get immediate approval for the L-program. In separate discussions between the Chief and defence minister Sven Andersson in Autumn 1958 regarding nuclear weapons and the budget plan for the coming financial years, Andersson made it clear that he favored the acquisition of nuclear weapons, but the split within the Social Democrats was so stark that it was better to not bring up the matter for discussion. Prime Minister Erlander's view was to study the question within the committee of the party and to come up with a proposition by the annual party congress in 1960. Andersson attempted to persuade the Chief to not request budgetary resources for the L-program, because they would likely be rejected. Despite Andersson's suggestions, the Supreme Commander instead opted to include funds for L-program in his fiscal year 1959/1960 budget proposal. Swedlund's diaries and other documents suggest that he had limited understanding of the political game, not least within the parties, even though his own statements in 1957 contributed to the creation of nuclear weapons resistance. He also believed that many of the senior politicians would be able to handle the issue as he desired. His lack of flexibility and belief that personal connections would overcome political opposition ultimately killed his funding request for L-program. While the L-program was left unfunded, FOA was given a large allocation for fiscal year 1959/1960 for "increased research in atomic-, missile-, countermeasure-, and other areas" in which the S-program was relevant.

== Freedom of action and enhanced defence research ==
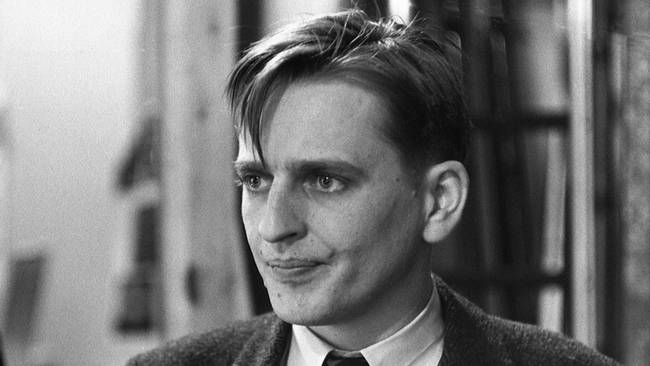
Olof Palme headed a parliamentary committee on the "nuclear issue".

In November 1958, Tage Erlander convened a party Atomic Weapons Committee (AWC) where advocates from both sides and military experts got together. The Prime Minister was initially inclined to take the pro-nuclear side, in the meantime he did not want to risk dividing the party over the nuclear issue. The Social Democrats, who kept losing their electorate, had to build a coalition with the adamantly anti-nuclear Communists. Olof Palme was Secretary of the Working Group on the nuclear issue.

Palme presented his report on 12 November 1959. The report suggests that Sweden should choose to maintain its freedom of action, i.e. not to commit to any views in the issue of nuclear weapons acquisition. As a concession to the nuclear opponents, Palme suggested to postpone the final decision on the acquisition of nuclear weapons. Freedom of action should be maintained through continued nuclear weapons research and a clear demonstration to the nuclear weapons supporters that the research would not imply any real delay as the civil nuclear program had been pursued in parallel to the military program for several years. The research was not explicitly promoted as a replacement for L-program, rather it was promoted as "expanded defence research". This report implied that the drafted 1958 S-program could be continued and in fact moved even closer to the L-program in scope. The leadership of the Social Democratic party adopted the working group's line on 14 December 1959, so did the Party Congress in 1960. The Government Directive to FOA was issued on 17 June 1960. As a result, in 1958, the Swedish government prohibited research and development (R&D) of nuclear weapons. Regardless, research activities related to how best to defend against a nuclear weapons attack were continued.

In talks between Prime Minister Erlander and Supreme Commander Swedlund in 1959, Erlander confirmed that the program on enhanced defence research would give results with regard to the warhead design. He emphasized, however, that he was uncertain about the effect it would have on the nuclear weapons issue and would delay the final decision on production until closer to the estimated date of completion in 1963. Thus, Palme preferred to postpone the crucial decision for years, with the goal of avoiding a serious split in the party, as opposed to a difficult compromise necessary to satisfy the desires of both sides for the long run. The implication of this doctrine meant that almost any nuclear weapons research could be pursued under the terms "defence research" and "freedom of action", while the Social Democratic leadership and the government had partially included the nuclear opponents’ lines in their public declarations. With the nuclear opponents essentially co-opted, AMSA's activity was diminished, and the Swedish peace movement started focusing primarily on advocating reduction of nuclear arsenals in the major nuclear powers. When the government brought up the issue in 1961, Erlander said that he himself now swung in the negative direction regarding the nuclear program, as compared to his views 3–4 years earlier, which he had never announced publicly. The decision that was expected to be made in the coming years remained suspended. The research was continued and the freedom of action doctrine was intact. Erlander's scientific adviser, Torsten Gustafson, was one of those advocating for the continued investment in research.

== The civilian research and nuclear weapons programs diverge ==
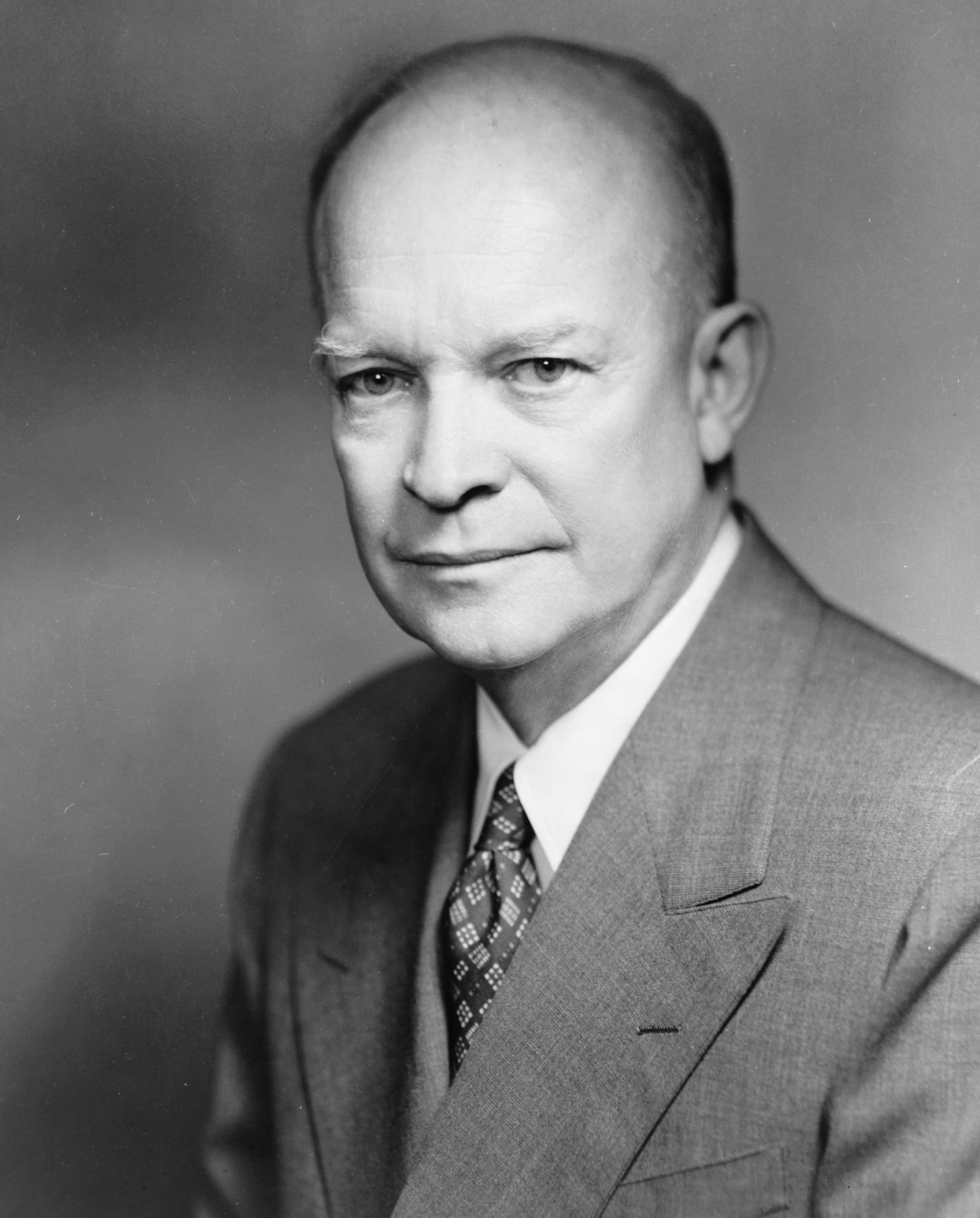
US President Dwight D. Eisenhower

Following the 1956 decision regarding Sweden's roadmap towards nuclear power, the civilian nuclear program began to outpace the military nuclear program. This was in spite of the fact that the "Swedish line" was adopted partially to maintain Sweden's Freedom of action with respect to nuclear weapons development. The two programs diverged for multiple reasons. Although AB Atomenergi was part of the nuclear weapons program, its primary goal was to develop nuclear reactors suitable for power production, in the process staying ahead of energy suppliers such as Vattenfall and Asea. In the early 1950s, Sweden also gained access to American knowledge regarding nuclear technology. American President Dwight D. Eisenhower launched the Atoms for Peace program in his speech in December 1953. In 1955, the program was followed by the publication of a large amount of documents at the International Conference on the Peaceful Use of Atomic Energy in Geneva.

Through this program, Sweden was able to obtain materials from America both faster and cheaper than had it relied on internal production. However, such access required comprehensive assurances that the materials were used only for civil purposes. On 1 July 1955, the first agreement was signed between Sweden and the United States regarding nuclear material. A second agreement on cooperation in civil nuclear research was signed on 18 January 1956. As a result, Sweden got access to some previously classified materials, and the opportunity to import small amounts of enriched uranium and heavy water at prices lower than those from Norway. The agreement required guarantees that the materials would not be used for the production of nuclear weapons or for any other military purposes.

The safeguards that AB Atomenergi issued for the R3 reactor (Ågestaverket) in 1957 implied challenges for the nuclear weapons program. It was not started up until 1963, and was put under bilateral safeguards according to an April 1958 agreement with the United States because it was to use U.S.-supplied fuel. The main source was supposed to be the Marviken reactor. However, Marviken's reactor design was found to be poor and work was abandoned in 1970. From 1959 onwards, Swedish interest in pursuing a uranium mill at Ranstad (the construction of which was decided in 1958 and scheduled to open in 1963) and a domestic supply of heavy water declined. The idea of domestic supply of nuclear fuel and other strategic materials was thus gradually abandoned and the Swedish contribution to "the Swedish line" came to be limited down to the design and construction of nuclear reactors.

== Plutonium problem ==
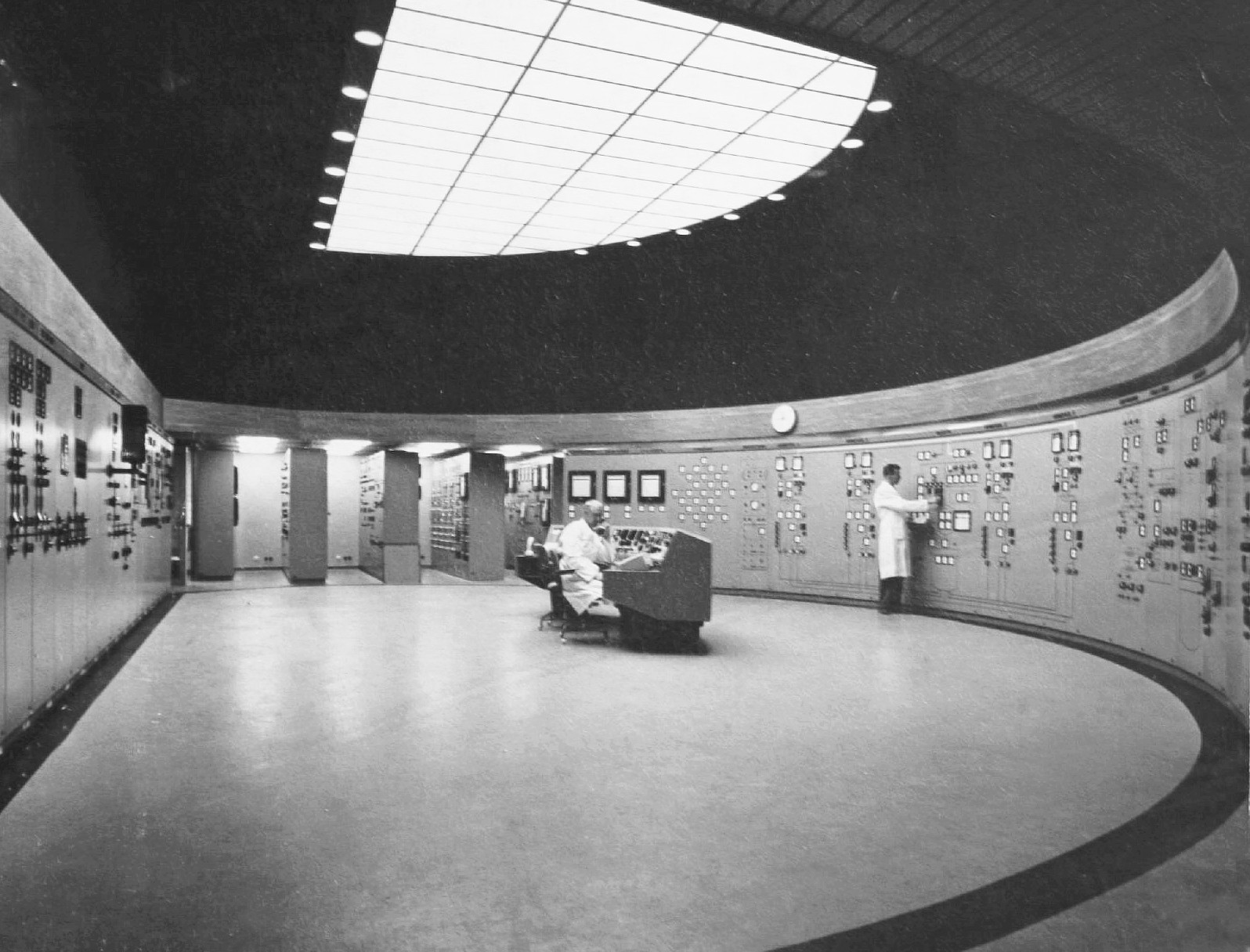
Control room in Ågesta

As the civilian nuclear program pursued energy, the problem of getting access to plutonium, for both research and subsequent production of nuclear weapons, loomed as the biggest technical problem for the nuclear weapons program. For many research purposes, such as metallurgy, plutonium containing more than 7% Pu-240 could be used, although this isotopic mixture could not be used as weapons-grade plutonium. Plutonium of this composition could be obtained relatively easily from the reprocessing of spent nuclear fuel from civilian reactors. However, to do so would require explicit violation of the agreed upon safeguards. A prerequisite for such activities would be conducting the nuclear reprocessing solely in Sweden, although the capacity to do so did not exist when reactor R3 was put into operation. Thus, Reactor R3 was less useful to the nuclear weapons program than it was originally intended.

As a result, in 1957 the Swedish Government started to study the opportunity to set up and operate one or possibly two purely military reactors for plutonium production located in caverns. In July 1958, upon the study the AB Atomenergi and FOA concluded that a military reactor, using aluminum fuel elements and heavy water as moderator, would lead to lower costs of production than if they used civil reactors. However, that kind of reactor would require significant investments, and because of its proposed underground location, it would take 4.5 years to build the reactor. The decreased civilian interest in domestic supply of raw materials resulted in revision of plans to build nuclear weapons facilities in Sweden in 1959 and 1960. However, now they required a uranium facility, heavy water reactor, and reprocessing plant to be able to supply plutonium. This led to a sharp increase in time and cost estimates. These facilities were included in none of the 1958 drafts, – neither in the S- nor L- programs. Thus their funding was not included in the program for extended defence research approved by the Government. The Ministry of Defence and FOA's assessment of the situation in 1961 concluded that it was solely plutonium supply that was the limiting factor for the nuclear weapons program. From 1961 onwards, the Ministry of Defence announced that the program's schedule was postponed for this reason. The only plutonium that ever existed in Sweden was 100 grams received from the United Kingdom for research purposes. After Sweden gave up the idea of domestic plutonium production, the work was handed over to the Institute of Atom Energy (IFA) in Kjeller, Norway.

== Pondering over purchases of nuclear material from the United States ==
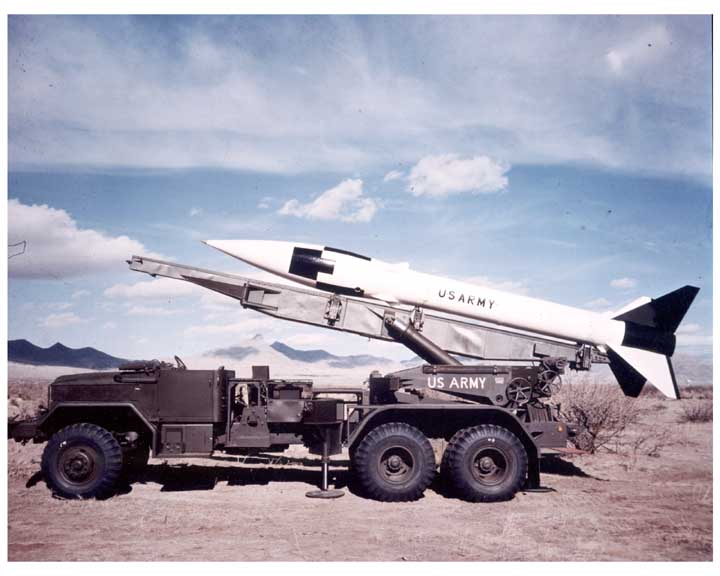
MGR-1 Honest John missile and launcher

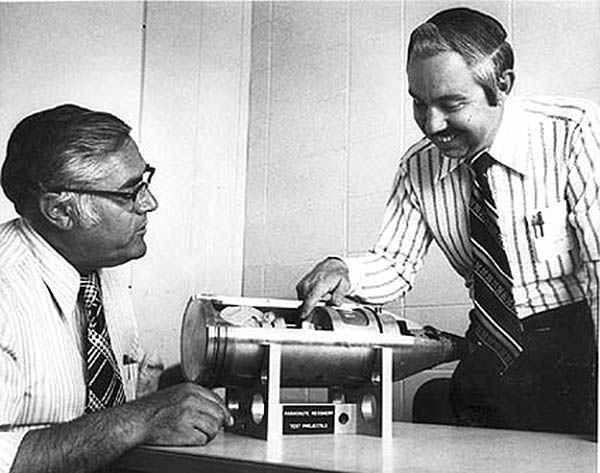
Cut-away model of the W48 artillery shell

In 1954, when the Supreme Commander advocated for Swedish nuclear weapons, internal production was not the only option considered. An agreement with Western powers that would quickly come to Sweden's aid, or a purchase of a small number of nuclear weapons from the West, most likely the US, were options also considered. The latter option appeared to be the best from both time and cost perspective, as far as it was possible. After 1954, the Swedish Government made inroads regarding the possibility of purchasing nuclear weapons from the US. The Swedish Government knew that American legislation forbid such exports but they hoped to be favorably treated, regardless of the fact that they were not a NATO member-state. The Swedish Government believed the US would be interested in a well-defended Sweden as a bulwark against Soviet aggression.

FOA's Torsten Magnusson met with the American envoy Howard A. Robinson in November 1954, and Malte Jacobsson from the Atom Committee talked to Lewis Strauss from Atomic Energy Commission in April 1955. Sweden indicated that it would be interested in purchasing approximately 25 nuclear devices. In 1957, Ambassador Erik Boheman raised the question at the US State Department, while the Swedish Ministry of Defence inquired about sending Swedish officers to train on the use of nuclear weapons. Boheman also mentioned that Denmark and Norway had already purchased weapons systems that could carry nuclear warheads, although neither country had devices to deploy on such systems. The American response was dismissive because Sweden, as a non-NATO state, did not have any mutual defence agreement with the US, which was a requirement in American law to even consider nuclear weapons cooperation. The message was clear - if Sweden reconsidered its nonalignment policy, the US would consider a new request from Sweden, otherwise discussions would be fruitless. Analysis from the US State Department in 1959, showed that Sweden did not have to be a NATO-member for the proposed nuclear weapons sales, but it had to, at the very minimum, have an agreement with the US regarding use of nuclear weapons, which would imply Sweden renouncing nonalignment. On 6 April 1960, the United States National Security Council decided that the Americans should not support the Swedish ownership of nuclear weapons, nor did it approve of the idea of a Swedish nuclear weapons program. The US Government believed that Western interests would be best served against the Soviet Union if Sweden invested its limited resources in conventional weapons, rather than an expensive nuclear weapons program.

In 1960, while Sweden was deciding on its stance toward nuclear weapons, Swedish representatives, through their contacts with the American Department of Defence gained access to some secret information in the late 1960s. This information included nuclear weapons tactics, reconnaissance requirements, ideas regarding the necessity of quick decision-making, and nuclear physics data. Swedish representatives also looked at the MGR-1 Honest John weapons system that could utilize W7 or W31 nuclear warheads. For artillery purposes, the US developed a W48 projectile for 155 mm artillery with 0.072 kiloton effect. Any plans for such a small Swedish nuclear device have never been recovered.

== Planned nuclear devices ==
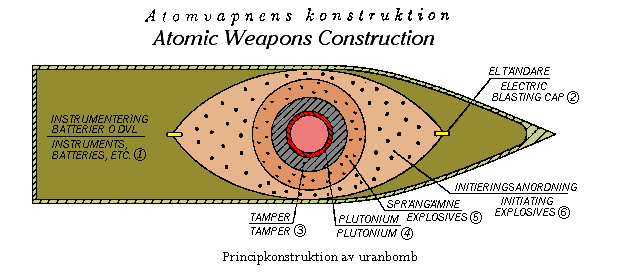
Schematic design of a 1956 Swedish atomic bomb (which was never built)

The planned Swedish bombs intended to utilize Pu-239 as the fissile material. When the early drafts (circa 1955) were replaced by the more concrete estimates a proposed design, one of the first drafts was a bomb weighing 400–500 kg and 35 cm in diameter. A bomb of those dimensions could have been carried by the A 32 Lansen. A study conducted by the nuclear explosive group in 1961-1962 outlined a plan to acquire 100 tactical nuclear bombs with approximate yields of 20 kt.

== Planned delivery systems ==
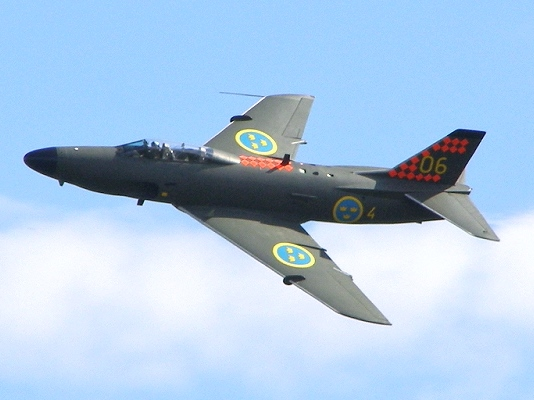
A Saab 32 Lansen at Kristianstad Airshow 2006

In military studies concerning the deployment of nuclear weapons, Swedish plans focused on bombs dropped by ground-attack aircraft. The Swedes planned to have a relatively small number of tactical nuclear weapons; the Saab 36 bomber was supposed to be able to carry an 800 kg free falling nuclear weapon, but development of the aircraft was cancelled in 1957. Thus, it was the Air Force's most modern fighter-bomber that was intended to carry nuclear weapons as well as other weaponry. Had the program followed its original schedule, the Saab A32 Lansen would have been the relevant platform. According to the revised schedule in which nuclear weapons would have appeared first in the 1970s, the AJ 37 Viggen would have also been relevant.

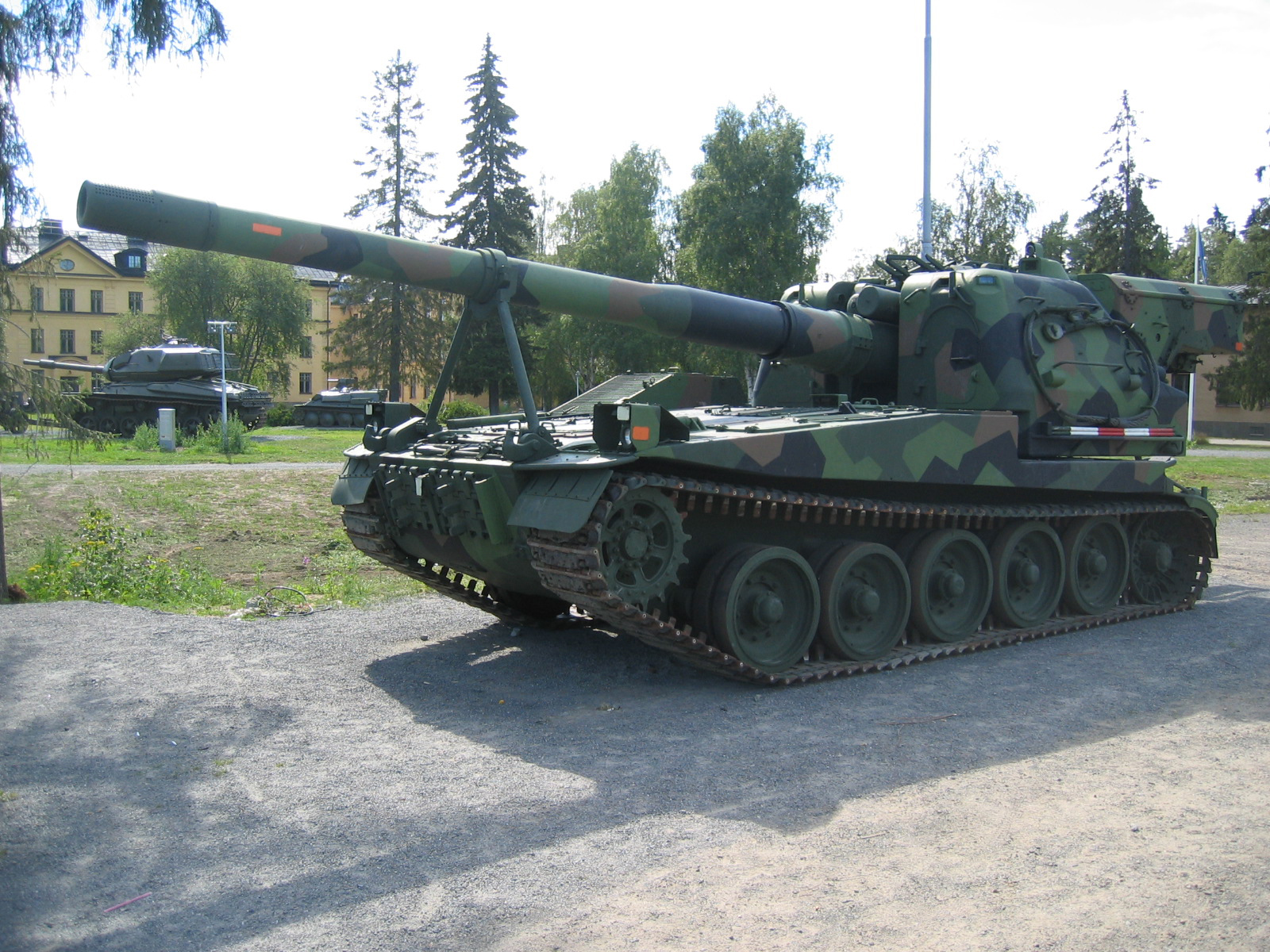
Bandkanon 1

The studies of nuclear payloads also briefly discussed the possibility of using land-based missiles with a range of about 100 km, as well as nuclear-armed torpedoes. The most likely configuration would have been Sjöormen-class submarine firing modified Torped 61 torpedoes. Little else is known about these alternative plans, since the Swedish program focused mainly on bombs dropped by aircraft. From 1957 to 1959, Saab developed Robot 330, a land attack missile with 500 km range, which was designed to carry nuclear warheads. The project was shut down due to excessive costs.

Some other types of weapons outlined and developed during the 1950—60s were designed as carriers for nuclear weapons – among them, the Saab A36, a strategic bomber, Bandkanon 1, a 155 mm artillery piece, and Robot 08, an anti-ship missile. These claims have been circulating since the times when the defence studies were still classified. There were certainly first drafts concerning the physical shape of Swedish nuclear weapon when the Saab A36 was under development, but the project A36 was soon abandoned in favor of the Saab AJ 37 Viggen when the first detailed military (rather than merely physical or technical) studies were conducted in 1961–62. Thus, even if the A36 was not designed to be an integral part of the nuclear weapons program itself, it was constructed specifically as a nuclear weapons carrier. A36 pilots were to specialize in this task.

As for Robot 08, the previously classified documents provide no support for the claim that something other than aerial bombs would have been prioritized. Nuclear-armed anti-ship missiles (as the RBS-15 is believed to have such a non-conventional option capability), as well as nuclear-armed torpedoes, would primarily have been targeted at naval transportation. However, the study of nuclear devices came to the conclusion that a bomb dropped in the home port would have the greatest impact. At sea, naval fleets would be dispersed to reduce casualties from nuclear attack. Statements about plans on nuclear ammunition for 155 mm Swedish artillery greater than 25 km range should be viewed with even greater skepticism. Since the US developed nuclear ammunition for its 155 mm artillery and the USSR developed ammunition for its 152 mm, certainly a Swedish device was technically possible. The only American type of device of this calibre that was actually completed, W48, had only a 72-ton yield even though it required as much plutonium as a significantly higher yielding device. Explosives with greater effect were primarily used in artillery with 203 mm and 280 mm barrels. These artillery projectiles used a different design principal, linear implosion instead of a traditional spherical implosion bomb. Such designs sacrificed efficiency and yield to reduce the payload's diameter. Since Sweden's plutonium supply was always a limiting factor in its nuclear program, and cost-effectiveness was a concern, it is unlikely that Sweden would have sacrificed multiple aerial bombs to build one battlefield device, especially when taking into account the reduced yield and additional development expenses.

== Intended employment of nuclear weapons ==
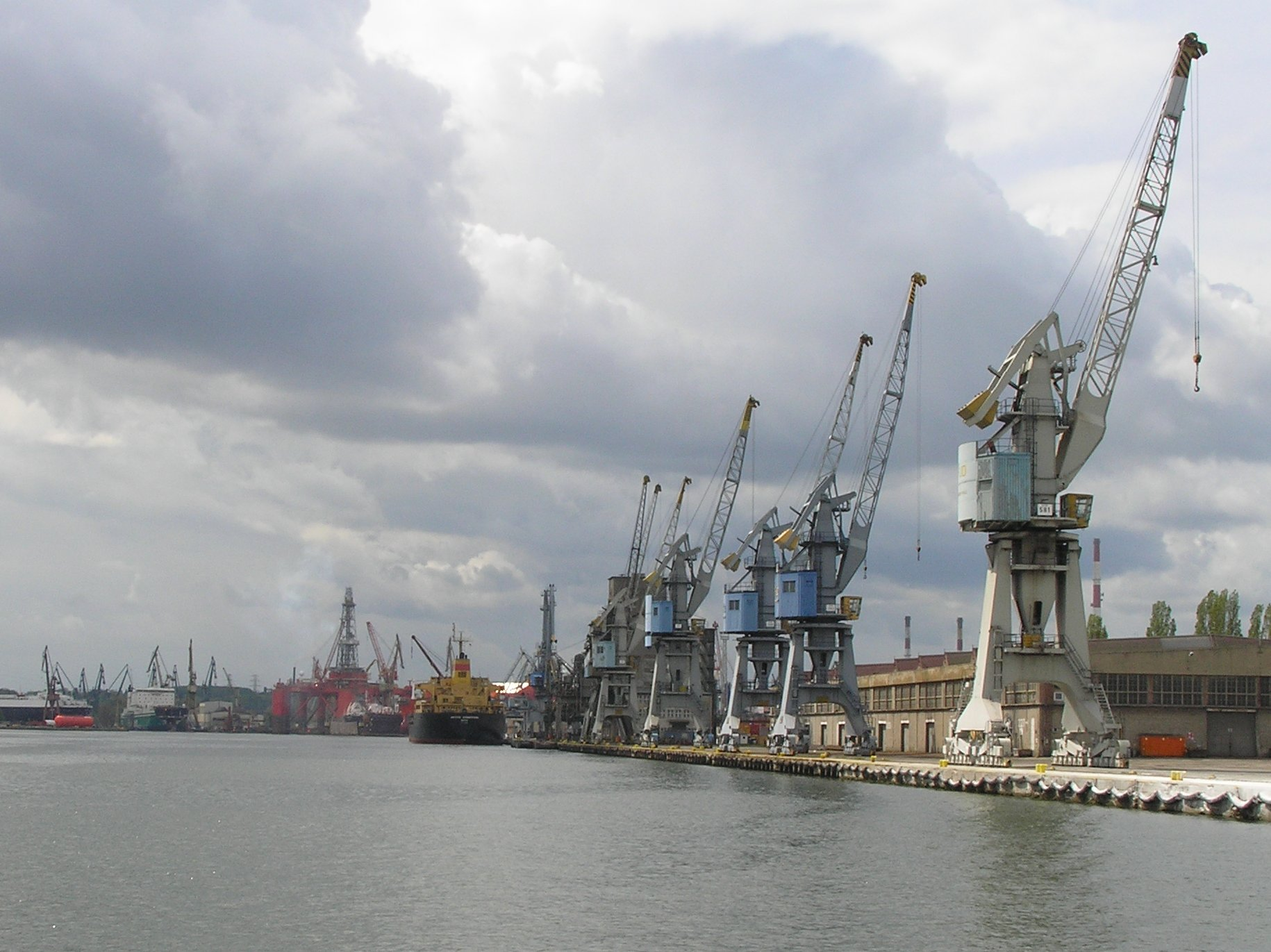
Harbour and shipyard in Gdańsk - were considered as a potential target on the Baltic Sea

From the beginning, the Swedes dismissed the opportunity to acquire their own strategic nuclear forces that could reach an adversary's major population centers, because Sweden had no strategic bombers. Instead, the Swedish Government sought to develop tactical nuclear weapons to be used against militarily significant targets in Sweden's neighboring countries, in the event of war. The prime example of such a target could be enemy ports on the Baltic Sea, another such target could be enemy air bases. As most ports were located in close proximity to civilian population centers, they too would suffer if Swedish nuclear weapons were used. With this in mind, the Ministry of Defence arrived at the conclusion that any such use would have major political consequences, even if the device employed was a tactical rather than strategic nuclear weapon.

The Swedish Government intended to possess tactical nuclear weapons primarily as a deterrent against attacks on Sweden. Assuming the aggressor was not deterred, they would have been forced to make significant tactical adjustments due to the risk of being subject to nuclear attack. Much of the tactical adjustments would have largely been the commitment of a larger amount of time and resources to the attack. In this respect, the possession of nuclear weapons would help to restore balance of conventional forces. In order to prevent the elimination of nuclear striking ability by a surprise attack, the Swedish Government outlined a system where the majority of warheads would be stored divided amongst heavily defended caverns, and the rest would move between airbases. These plans were named as "Ahasverus system" and can be compared to the idea of second-strike capability.

== The shift in opinion at the ministry of defence ==
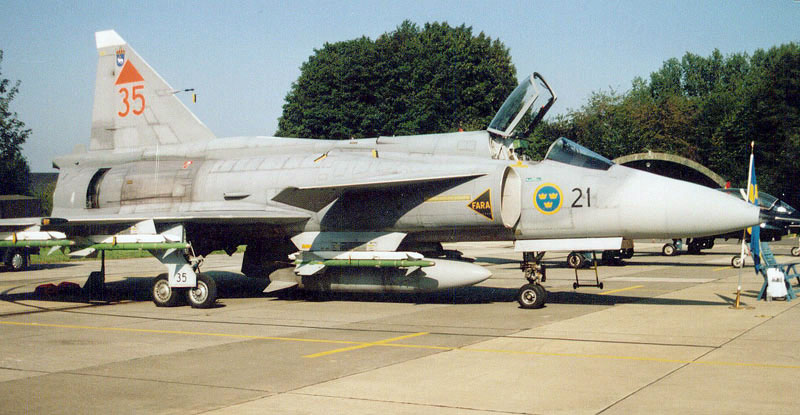
Saab JA 37 37447 Swedish Air Force

After the ardent nuclear advocate Nils Swedlund retired and turned the post of Supreme Commander over to Torsten Rapp, some officials in the Ministry of Defence began to express doubts regarding the nuclear weapons program. This can be understood in light of delays caused by plutonium enrichment challenges and growing cost estimates. The first skeptical views came from the Air Force and were announced in 1961 by Air Chief of Staff Stig Norén to his counterparts in other branches of the military and to the elected Defence Chief of Staff, Carl Eric Almgren in connection with the preparation work for the 1962 report. As result, a special working group, the nuclear explosive group, was formed under the leadership of Colonel Åke Mangård. This group worked from June 1961 until February 1962 and conducted comprehensive analyses of the consequences and the military value of possession of nuclear weapons. Through influence of the Air Force, the 1962 report expressed a more ambivalent position towards nuclear weapons than the 1957 report, though it was still largely positive.

It may seem paradoxical that the Air Force changed opinion on nuclear weapons given the expansion of the relative importance of the US Air Force following America's adoption of nuclear weapons. At the time, however, the Air Force was facing an expensive acquisition of the Saab 37 Viggen, and feared that a full-scale nuclear weapons program would compete with it for resources. One of the points that Norén wanted to investigate was what conventional forces Sweden could acquire if it decided not to develop nuclear weapons. It was the plan that the United States suggested Sweden to follow in 1960. However, it remains unclear whether or not this suggestion influenced Sweden's defence officials.

The rumor that Swedlund was replaced by an Air Force officer sometimes arises given that the Ministry of Defence chose to prioritize new aircraft over nuclear weapons. Some have pointed out that the increase in flexibility was likely due to replacing Swedlund with somebody new, as his successor did not have a strong opinion one way or the other. In the 1965 report, the Supreme Commander took another step away from assuming a nuclear armed Sweden. Although they were still advocating for Swedish nuclear weapons in general terms, they were no longer emphasized in defence planning. They felt that there was an imminent risk that Swedish nuclear possession would be prohibited as a result of the ongoing disarmament negotiations. The report also looked favorably on the notion of defending Sweden with modern conventional forces as they now embraced the Margin Doctrine. The Margin Doctrine assumed that an invasion of Sweden would not occur in isolation, but rather as a part of a major conflict; in such a situation, a large power (e.g. the USSR) would be unlikely to deploy its full military forces against Sweden.

== The 1980 referendum ==
The debate among the major Swedish political parties over the nuclear program had been intensified throughout the 1970s. In 1973, the ruling Center Party declared that it was against Sweden's nuclear power program, thereby letting the coalition government to become a leader in the anti-nuclear movement aimed at the program's complete elimination. The Three Mile Island accident in the United States in 1979 undermined public confidence in the safety of Sweden's nuclear program. The aforementioned political and societal divisions over the Swedish nuclear program led to a referendum on the subject held in 1980. "The referendum was of a non-binding, "advisory" nature and voters who supported nuclear energy were not given the choice to do so. The referendum's result heavily favored option two, 39.1 percent of the votes, and option three, 38.7 percent of the votes, with option three receiving 18.9 percent of the 4.7 million votes cast, representing a 75.7 percent voter turnout." The 1980 referendum induced the Swedish parliament to decide that Sweden's nuclear power program should be "phased-out" by 2010 and no further nuclear power plants should be built. That decision made the Swedish government the first out of five governments that have approved a national nuclear phase-out policy: Belgium, Germany, Italy, and Spain.

== The end of nuclear weapons program and Swedish disarmament policy ==
In the late 1950s, Swedish Minister for Foreign Affairs Östen Undén advocated for the nuclear test ban treaty in the United Nations (UN). Since 1962 Sweden has been actively involved in the international disarmament negotiations. Once the decision to cease offensive nuclear weapons research activities was made, the Swedish government was seeking to create an international legal framework to regulate nuclear weapons-related research and activities. On 4 December 1961, the United Nations General Assembly, based on a Swedish initiative, adopted Resolution 1664 (XVI). The resolution called on the UN Secretary-General to investigate the circumstances under which non-nuclear weapon states would give up the nuclear option.

In March 1962, Sweden joined seven other neutral countries, members of the Eighteen Nation Committee on Disarmament, a predecessor to the Conference on Disarmament (CD). In 1968, Sweden signed the Nuclear non-proliferation Treaty (NPT) and thereby publicly committed itself against the acquisition of nuclear weapons. Shortly after joining the NPT, Sweden became a founding member of the Zangger Committee, which was designed to work out the exact definitions of the material and equipment to be restricted by the NPT. The Committee drafted a "Trigger List" of "source or special fissionable materials" and "equipment or materials specially designed or prepared for the processing, use, or production of fissile materials". In continuation, Sweden has occupied an active position in generating of new agreements that would control the export of the listed items to non-NPT states. These agreements and Trigger List have subsequently constituted the first major agreement on nuclear export regulations.

The negotiations between the Soviet Union, Great Britain, and the US in August 1962 ended in an agreement to abandon all nuclear weapons tests in the atmosphere, outer space, and underwater. Leaders of other states were also encouraged to sign the treaty, which came as a surprise to Sweden. After a brief time for consideration, the Swedish government decided to sign the Treaty despite their Freedom of action doctrine. In the meantime, the Treaty did not prohibit underground nuclear tests thus the Freedom of action could be maintained.

After the CTBT entered into force in 1963, the FOA was assigned to build a seismographic complex to monitor the compliance with the treaty. The Swedish negotiators were quiet on the question of non-proliferation for years, particularly in view of the Swedish freedom of action doctrine. Until 1965, there was an official directive to not raise the issue. The situation changed in early 1966. In March 1966, Undersecretary of the Defence Department Karl Frithiofson in his speech before the Royal Swedish Academy of War Sciences publicly announced that it was of no interest to Sweden to acquire nuclear weapons, which was a slight difference from the Freedom of action doctrine.

== Reasons to abandon nuclear program ==
Firstly, it appeared increasingly problematic to find room for a nuclear weapons program in the defence economy; secondly, the situation was proving that future wars would be likely waged with conventional weapons (especially, after studying the NATO's flexible response doctrine); thirdly, it was decided (yet unclear how) that Sweden was covered by the US nuclear umbrella. Just before the Government's position became known, the Defence Ministry announced that Sweden's security would be undermined if the country joined the non-proliferation agreement, because the treaty addressed small countries that hadn't acquired any nuclear weapons yet, while the US and the Soviet Union's nuclear possessions remained untouched. Thus, Sweden was under risk to yield its Freedom of action to nothing in return, while the nuclear threat against the country would remain.

The United States was not particularly in favor of a nuclear Sweden. The cooperation agreement between Sweden and the United States, that established bilateral safeguards for Swedish nuclear installations, forbade Sweden from using equipment and materials to develop nuclear weapons. In the meantime, the use of U.S. uranium would mean accepting inspection requirements, which would prevent the uranium in question from being used for weapons production. The more Sweden's research in nuclear weapons was becoming dependent on U.S. military assistance, the more the United States was willing to steer Sweden away from implementing its plans to create a nuclear weapon.

Finally, Swedish politicians and diplomats across party lines have been very outspoken about nonproliferation and disarmament. The most well-known individuals include Dr. Hans Blix, Rolf Ekéus, and Henrik Salander, who have chaired, or currently chair, the United Nations Monitoring, Verification and Inspection Commission, the United Nations Special Commission, and the Middle Powers Initiative, respectively. Additionally, the late Anna Lindh, Sweden's former minister for foreign affairs, took the lead in promotion of non-proliferation policy, which eventually affected the European Union's strategy to combat the proliferation of weapons of mass destruction (WMD). Lindh also instigated the International WMD Commission, chaired by Blix, which in 2006 released its study, which offers over 60 recommendations on how to reduce the threat posed by WMD. The negotiations resulted in the non-proliferation treaty, which was ready for signature in 1968. Sweden signed the treaty on 19 August 1968, immediately after West Germany had done the same.

Karl Frithiofson in his speech in March 1966 announced that Sweden gave up its plans to acquire nuclear weapons, which in its turn put the end to the freedom of action doctrine. In 1968, the doctrine was turned into defence investigation, and with the signature of the NPT in 1968 FOA began the process of dismantling of nuclear-weapons related research.

== Disarmament of Swedish nuclear sites ==
The roll-up of FOA's nuclear weapons research started in 1967 while the shift to another defence research direction (conventional weapons-related) occurred. From 1968 onward, the remained nuclear weapons-related research focused on security issues, whereas the activities directly related to the nuclear program were completed in 1972. The plutonium laboratory in Ursvik was shut down.

Reactor R2 went critical in 1960. In 1963, FOA halted criticality experiments, and by July 1972, even theoretical research using its acquired plutonium was shut down. Earlier, primarily due to cost, Sweden opted to use U.S.-designed light water reactors using imported enriched uranium in lieu of heavy water reactors operating on indigenous uranium. Also, the Swedish supreme commander announced that the country abandoned the nuclear option in 1965. Another key event was an electrical problem at the Ågesta that jeopardized the reactor's cooling system. Although a meltdown was averted, the Swedish government was informed. The public, however, was kept in the dark until 1993, as the government was afraid that such a disclosure would endanger public support for nuclear energy. The year 1974 also marked the final disassembly of all plutonium facilities and a reorganization of FOA that dispersed its nuclear expertise. The Ågesta reactor was permanently shut down. Vattenfall, the contractor responsible for the Marviken reactor, became increasingly skeptical of the project's chances for success. Two key areas were mentioned: the idea of using superheated water and the reshuffling machine. Additionally, it became apparent that the plant would not satisfy the safety standards established by the U.S. Atomic Energy Commission in the late 1960s. By 1969, the plans to build a superheated reactor were scrapped.

The first commercial nuclear power plant Oskarshamn 1 was commissioned in 1972 and was followed by another eleven units sited at Barsebäck, Oskarshamn Ringhals and Forsmark in the time period up to 1985. The twelve commercial reactors constructed in Sweden comprise 9 BWRs (ASEA-ATOM design) and 3 PWRs (Westinghouse design). In 2004, Studsvik Nuclear (an institute established in 1958 for the Swedish nuclear program with research reactors) decided to permanently shut down the two research reactors (R2 and R2–0) at the Studsvik site. They were closed in June 2005. "The decision was taken on economical grounds, the licenses had recently been extended until 2014, subject to certain conditions. The reactors were mainly used for commercial materials testing purposes, isotope production, neutron source for research purposes, medical applications and higher education. They are currently under decommissioning." Foreign observers judged that Swedish nuclear capabilities reached a very advanced level and that, at the end of its nuclear program, Sweden was technically capable of building a nuclear weapon within a short time.

== After the nuclear weapons program: defence research and support for disarmament ==
Nuclear weapons related activity, however, continued at FOA even after the dismantling was completed in 1972, but to a much lesser extent. Resources in 1972 amounted about the third of the stock in 1964–1965. Actual defence research on nuclear weapons effects continued. It did not include design research or any part of the Freedom of action doctrine. Paradoxically, that part of the nuclear research was given a low priority because "defence research" was merely a politically correct name. The remaining technical expertise in construction of nuclear weapons was later utilized in different disarmament contexts.

== Sweden and non-proliferation movement ==
In 1974, a multilateral export control regime — the Nuclear Suppliers Group (NSG) was created as a successor to the Zangger Committee. The NSG established general guidelines on nuclear transfers and dual-use technologies to further restrict the management of nuclear exports. Sweden as well as seven other states (Belgium, Czechoslovakia, the German Democratic Republic, Italy, the Netherlands, Poland, and Switzerland), joined the NSG between 1976 and 1977.

In 1980, Prime Minister Olof Palme established the Independent Commission on Disarmament and Security Issues, also known as the Palme Commission. The Commission favored the demilitarization of space, the elimination of chemical arms from Europe, and the reduction of conventional weapons. The commission also advocated negotiations in Europe to reduce political tensions among the states and political actors that could have a potential for military conflict. In the early 1980s, Sweden was one of 58 nations signatory to the convention on the Physical Protection of Nuclear Material. In compliance with the convention, Sweden adopted the Nuclear Activities Act and the Nuclear Activities Ordinance in 1984. The Acts were designed to prevent unlawful dealings with nuclear material and thereby ensure the safety of nuclear activities.

By 1984, Sweden had signed and ratified the Antarctic Treaty. The Treaty was established in 1961 to ban all military activity in Antarctica. The Antarctic Treaty was not, however, the first "nonarmament" treaty that Sweden signed. Previously it had participated in the establishment of the Outer Space Treaty in 1967, which restricts the placement of nuclear weapons or other types of weapons of mass destruction in space. The 1986 Chernobyl nuclear disaster evoked fears of radiation and safety. As a reaction to it, the Social Democratic-led Swedish government set 1995/1996 as years to start the implementation of a phase-out plan, including the shut-down of two nuclear reactors. Additionally, in 1999 and 2005 two other nuclear reactors (Barsebäck I and Barsebäck II, respectively) were closed. In 1992, in order to improve safety of Russian nuclear power plants, Sweden started cooperating with Russia on nuclear safety, radiation protection, nonproliferation, and proper nuclear waste management.

Sweden has also been an active participant at various international nonproliferation and disarmament meetings throughout the years. In 1998, Sweden was a founding member of the "New Agenda Coalition" (NAC). NAC called on the nuclear weapon states to commit to their disarmament obligations under Article VI of the NPT. At the 2000 NPT Review Conference, the NAC proposed the "13 steps" thereby breaking the meeting's deadlock. The "13 steps" provided a series of steps to meet the disarmament obligations contained in Article VI. Regarding the challenges of the phasing-out of nuclear energy in Sweden, the International Energy Agency's (IEA) 2004 review of Swedish energy policies called on Sweden to consider the costs of replacing nuclear power and the potential implications for energy security, greenhouse gas emissions, and economic growth.

However, regardless of potential risks associated with nuclear plants, the IEA's 2004 and 2008 reviews of Swedish energy policy elicited that abolishing nuclear energy would be very difficult, as around 45% of electricity in Sweden originates from nuclear power. It also assumed that in the post-Kyoto period targets for reducing greenhouse gas emissions would be stricter. In the meantime, with years public opinion against nuclear energy has diminished. In 2009, 62 percent of Swedes supported a Swedish nuclear program. Only 19 percent was against. As a result, the phase-out policy was abandoned in early 2009.

== Documents from the nuclear weapons program ==
According to the Swedish rules of secrecy, classified documents can be released after 40 years. Many documents on the Swedish nuclear program's development phase and most intensive periods had therefore been gradually opened to public during the 1990s, and laid the foundation for studies for such experts as Wilhelm Agrell and Thomas Jonter. Certain documents that are still classified can only be released after 70 years – thus, these documents on the Swedish nuclear program are not publicly available yet.

== Controversies around activities after 1985 ==
In 1985, newspaper Ny Teknik published some articles on the Swedish nuclear weapons acquisition and some facts that were previously unknown. The newspaper presented them as revelations. Ny Teknik argued that activities at FOA continued which appeared to be in direct conflict with the government's decision in 1958. As a result, the government appointed the then Legal Counsel of the Defence Department Olof Forssberg to investigate the issue. Forssberg's investigative work "Swedish nuclear weapons research 1945-1972" was completed in 1987. It concluded that no research had been conducted beyond the approved decision on defence research.

In November 1994, The Washington Post came out with an announcement that Sweden could have kept its nuclear weapons option open on the sly. That statement stemmed from the fact that the R3 reactor in Ågesta facility was still in place, but it was not subject to the ongoing inspection within the NPT framework. The reactor was shut down in 1974, but not dismantled. The Swedish Nuclear Power Inspectorate (SKI) pointed out that the reason for the facility not to be covered by the inspection was that Sweden signed the NPT in 1975 (not in 1968 when the NPT was ratified). Only then R3 was taken out of service and all fissile material was removed. Since none of the remaining components of the reactor had been maintained since 1974, the site was not viewed as an immediate subject for the SKI inspection.

== See also ==
- Sweden and weapons of mass destruction
- Nuclear power in Sweden

== Sources ==
- Agrell, Wilhelm (2002). Svenska förintelsevapen: utvecklingen av kemiska och nukleära stridsmedel 1928-1970 (in Swedish). Lund: Historiska media. ISBN 9189442490. SELIBR 8415678.
- Arnett, Eric (1998), "Norms and nuclear proliferation: Sweden's lessons for assessing Iran" (PDF), The Nonproliferation Review, The Project on Military Technology, Stockholm International Peace Research Institute (SIPRI), 5 (2): 32–43, doi:10.1080/10736709808436705.
- Bergenäs, Johan (10 February 2010), The Rise of a White Knight State: Sweden's Nonproliferation and Disarmament History, NTI.
- Bergenäs, Johan (11 November 2009), Sweden Reverses Nuclear Phase-out Policy, NTI
- Cole, Paul (1997), "Atomic Bombast: Nuclear Weapon Decision-Making in Sweden, 1946–72", Washington Quarterly, 20 (2): 233–251, doi:10.1080/01636609709550250
- Holmberg, Per Hedberg Sören (April 2008), Swedish Nuclear Power Policy. A Compilation of Public Record Material, The Research Project. Energy Opinion in Sweden, Gothenburg: Department of Political Science, University of Gothenburg
- Jonter, Thomas (1999), "Sverige, USA och kärnenergin – Framväxten av en svensk kärnämneskontroll 1945–1995", Ski Rapport (in Swedish), Uppsala: Historiska institutionen Uppsala universitet, ISSN 1104-1374.
- Jonter, Thomas (2010), "The Swedish Plans to Acquire Nuclear Weapons, 1945–1968: An Analysis of the Technical Preparations", Science & Global Security, 18 (2): 61–86, Bibcode:2010S&GS...18...61J, doi:10.1080/08929882.2010.486722, S2CID 122066226.
- Kåberger, Tomas (January–April 2007), "History of nuclear power in Sweden", Estudos Avançados, 21 (59), São Paulo: 229.
- Persbo, Andreas (16 November 2009), The Blue and Yellow Bomb, vol. 1, Arms Control Wonk.
- Prawitz, Jan (2001), Det svenska spelet om nedrustningen (in Swedish), Totalförsvarets forskningsinstitut (FOI).
- Reiss (1998), "Without the Bomb", The Nonproliferation Review, 5 (2): 32–43, doi:10.1080/10736709808436705, "Interviews with Swedish officers and officials", in Arnett 1998.
- Wentzel, Viggo (1994), "D21. Bits & bytes", Datasaabs historia, Datasaabs vänner, Linköping: Hur det började, pp. 7–9, ISBN 978-91-972464-08.
