= Tammelin =

Surname list

Tammelin is the surname of the following people:

- Bertha Tammelin (1836–1915), Swedish actress
- Gabriel Tammelin (1641–1698), Finnish vicar and translator
- Lars Tammelin (1669–1733), Finnish mathematician
- Lars-Erik Tammelin (1923–1991), Swedish chemist
- Matti Tammelin (1926–1998), Finnish boxer

== See also ==
- Tammelinn, neighbourhood of Tartu, Estonia
