= Sweden and weapons of mass destruction =

During the late 1940s and 1950s, Sweden had programs for both nuclear and chemical weapons. During the first decades of the Cold War, a nuclear weapons program was active.

No weapon was ever deployed. In the late 1960s, the political landscape and budgetary problems hindered the use of these weapons, and, by the mid-1970s, all plans for weapons of mass destruction had been scrapped.

== Nuclear weapons ==
Sweden's nuclear weapon programme was started in early 1946 after World War II and the American nuclear bombing of the Japanese cities Hiroshima and Nagasaki.

In the early years after the war, Sweden made a decision to become a neutral power that could defend itself militarily against any invading power. The biggest threats to Sweden were Soviet nuclear capabilities and, in the late 1940s and 1950s, much research was made into nuclear weapons.

In 1948, the first solid plans on how to create an atomic weapon was presented to the Swedish National Defence Research Institute (FOA). Plans were established to run a civilian nuclear power programme in parallel, using domestic uranium resources as nuclear fuel. The Ågesta and Marviken reactors were supposed to produce plutonium for the weapons, while also producing energy. The Saab 36 was a planned attack aircraft that would be able to deliver nuclear weapons. Later on, submarines and aircraft were configured as a means of delivery as well.

All of the nuclear development activities took place at the FOA. The plan was to produce 100 warheads in a timespan of ten years.

During the 1960s, it was still not clear if Sweden should develop a nuclear weapons capacity. By the end of the 1960s, the Swedish government, because of military budget constraints, had to choose between a nuclear weapon or a new fighter aircraft (the Saab 37 Viggen). The choice fell with the new fighter. All the plans for a Swedish nuclear weapon were scrapped by 1968, when Sweden signed the Nuclear Non-Proliferation Treaty. In 1972, the last remnants of a plan for nuclear weapons was discontinued when the FOA stopped their experiments with plutonium.

Sweden did, however, continue with civilian nuclear power and, as of 2012, Sweden had 10 active nuclear reactors. In March 2012, Sweden exported 3.3 kilograms (7.3 lb) of plutonium and approximately 9 kilograms (20 lb) of natural and depleted uranium to the United States under framework of the Global Threat Reduction Initiative.

== Chemical weapons ==
After World War I, Sweden started research on chemical weapons. In the 1930s, Sweden's first chemical weapon programme was born when developing and equipment research for sulfur mustards (mustard gas) was started. In 1940, work on the gas was temporarily halted, but, by the end of World War II, new programmes were soon a priority for the Swedish military. Programmes for both sulfur mustards and sarin were initiated.

In the 1960s, the development of chemical weapons was highly criticised, and, in 1970, the Swedish government stated that it would not further develop or produce any chemical weapons. In 1994, Sweden signed the Chemical Weapons Convention that forbids the development, production, stockpiling and use of chemical weapons.

== Biological weapons ==
Sweden is one of the parties to the Biological Weapons Convention, which outlaws biological weapons. The convention was signed by Sweden on February 27, 1974, in Moscow and again on February 27, 1975, in London and Washington, D.C. It was ratified by Sweden in February 1976.

== See also ==
- Swedish Armed Forces
