= Torsten Schmidt (officer) =

- Born: Torsten Andreas Schmidt; 23 February 1899; Landskrona, Sweden
- Died: 19 December 1996 (aged 97); Danderyd, Sweden
- Burial place: Landskrona Cemetery
- Military career
- Allegiance: Sweden
- Branch: Swedish Army
- Service years: 1919–1959
- Rank: Senior colonel

Senior Colonel Torsten Andreas Schmidt (23 February 1899 – 19 December 1996) was a Swedish Army officer. Schmidt began his military career in 1919, commissioned as a second lieutenant in the Wendes Artillery Regiment. Over the years, he climbed the ranks, attaining promotions such as lieutenant in 1923, captain in 1934, and major in 1937. Notably, he directed the Armed Forces Chemical Institute from 1937 to 1945 and served in various roles within the Defence Staff until 1959, reaching the rank of senior colonel. Beyond his military service, Schmidt contributed to Air Protection Investigation in 1936, was a member of the Atomic Committee from 1945 to 1959, and held several board positions, including the Defence Missile Board. His multifaceted career extended into teaching and insurance roles from 1960 to 1969. Schmidt was also involved in the Swedish Armed Forces' control of the Swedish defense research when it was set up before and during World War II, and when the Swedish nuclear research started.

== Early life ==
Schmidt was born on 23 February 1899 in Landskrona, Sweden, the son of the banker, vice district judge Martin Schmidt (1858–1942) and his wife Elisabeth Jeanette, née Bruzelius (1867–1911). After passed studentexamen in 1917.

== Career ==
=== Military career ===
Schmidt was commissioned as an officer in 1919 and was assigned as a second lieutenant to the Wendes Artillery Regiment (A 3). He attended the Artillery and Engineering College from 1921 to 1924. Schmidt was promoted to lieutenant in 1923 and was lieutenant in the anti-aircraft artillery in 1928. He served as an artillery staff officer from 1932 to 1937 and was promoted to captain in 1934 and was assistant teacher at Artillery and Engineering College from 1934 to 1938.

Schmidt was promoted to major in 1937 and was director of the Armed Forces Chemical Institute (Försvarsväsendets kemiska anstalt) from 1937 to 1945. Schmidt was major in the Svea Artillery Regiment (A 1) in 1940 and was promoted to lieutenant colonel in 1942. He was administrative director of the Defence Research Council (Försvarets forskningsnämnd) from 1943 to 1945, head of department at the Defence Staff from 1945 to 1959 and was promoted to colonel in the Swedish Army in 1947. Schmidt served at the Defence Staff from 1948 to 1959 and held the rank of senior colonel from 1956 to 1959. He was also head of section at the Defence Staff in 1959 and was placed in the reserve the same year.

He had assignment abroad in 1931, 1936–39, 1941, 1946 and 1950.

=== Other work ===
Schmidt was assisting in the Air Protection Investigation in 1936 and was a member of Atomic Committee (Atomkommittén) from 1945 to 1959 and board member of the Swedish National Defence Research Institute from 1945 to 1959 as well as the Review Board for Certain Patents from 1946 to 1959. He was chairman of the Defence Missile Board (Försvarets robotvapenråd) from 1948 to 1959, member of the Inquiry Concerning Protection Against Bacteriological Warfare from 1949 to 1951 (or 1952–53) and the Defence Medical Board of the Medical Research Council from 1951 to 1959. Schmidt was an expert in the Defence Medical Research Organization (Försvarsmedicinska forskningsorganisationen) in 1959 and the Defence Medical Research Advisory Committee (Försvarsmedicinska forskningsutredningen) from 1959 to 1962.

He served as a teacher and in insurance companies from 1960 to 1969.

== Personal life ==
Schmidt was married 1926–1936 to Elsa Elin Märta Vult von Steyern (born 1903), the daughter of Lieutenant Colonel Nils Vult von Steyern and Eva Hammar. He married a second time in 1938 to Karen Margrete Beatrice Bruun von Neergaard (1911–1986), the daughter of landowner, Major Alfried Bruun von Neergaard and Marion, née Schlubach. He was the father of Holger (born 1940), Harald (born 1941), and Christer (born 1942).

== Death ==
Schmidt died on 19 December 1996 and was buried in Landskrona Cemetery.

== Awards and decorations ==
=== Swedish ===
- (Sweden) Commander 1st Class of the Order of the Sword (5 June 1954)
- (Sweden) Knight of the Order of the Polar Star (1946)
- (Sweden) National Air Protection Federation Merit Badge in gold

=== Foreign ===
- (Finland) Order of the Cross of Liberty, 3rd Class with swords

== Honours ==
- Member of the Royal Swedish Academy of War Sciences (1944)

== Bibliography ==
- Schmidt, Torsten; Kretz, Åke (1937). Det civila luftskyddet i Europa [The civil air protection in Europe]. Kungl. Krigsvetenskapsakademiens handlingar och tidskrift, 0023-5369; 1937:1 (in Swedish). Stockholm: Krigsvetenskaps-akad.
