= Torsten Magnusson =

Swedish physicist (1907–1987)

- Born: Torsten Karl Adolf Magnusson; 24 December 1907; Vreta kloster, Sweden
- Died: 24 November 1987 (aged 79); Stocksund, Sweden
- Education: Uppsala University
- Known for: Swedish nuclear weapons program
- Spouse: Wera Ericsson (m. 1933; died 2003)
- Children: 4
- Scientific career
- Fields: Military science
- Workplaces: National Defence Research Institute
- Thesis: Investigations into absorption spectra in the extremely soft X-ray region and comparison between different mountings of the plate with concave grating (1938)

Torsten Karl Adolf Magnusson (24 December 1907 – 24 November 1987) was a Swedish physicist and defense research scientists. Magnusson was Director-General of the Swedish National Defence Research Institute (FOA) from 1968 to 1974 and was one of the prominent figures of the Swedish nuclear weapons program.

== Early life ==
Magnusson was born on 24 December 1907 in Vreta Kloster Parish in Linköping Municipality, Östergötland County, Sweden, the son of Carl Magnusson, a station master, and his wife Signe (née Samuelsson). He received a Bachelor of Arts degree (fil.kand.) from Uppsala University in 1929, Master of Philosophy (fil.mag.) in 1932, Licentiate of Philosophy (fil.lic.) in 1936 and Doctor of Philosophy (fil.dr.) in 1938 with a dissertation on X-ray spectroscopy.

== Career ==
Magnusson was first assistant from 1937 to 1940 and associate professor (laborator) from 1940 to 1944 at the Royal Swedish Academy of Sciences's Research Institute of Physics. He was administrative director from 1941 to 1944 and prefect from 1944 to 1945 at the Military Physics Institute. The institute became the National Defence Research Institute (FOA) in 1945 with Magnusson as head of the department (FOA 2; general physics 1945–58 and FOA 4; nuclear physics and nuclear chemistry 1958–68) from 1945 to 1968. In 1945, Magnusson was given the task by the board of FOA to investigate what was known about the nuclear device that was recently dropped on Hiroshima and Nagasaki. It was the start of the Swedish nuclear research.

Magnusson became Director-General of FOA in 1968, a position he held until 1974. Magnusson was a member of the Swedish National Committee for Physics (Svenska nationalkommittén för fysik) from 1946 to 1970 and a member of the Atom Committee (Atomkommittén) from 1952. He was also a member of the Swedish Atomic Research Council (Statens råd för atomforskning) from 1952 to 1965 and a delegate in atomic energy issues from 1956 to 1974 as well as in the Data Processing Delegation (Databehandlingsdelegationen) from 1966. He was a board member of the Defence Materiel Administration from 1968 to 1974, AB Atomenergi from 1969 to 1975 and the National Swedish Nuclear Power Inspection Board (Statens kärnkraftinspektion) from 1974 to 1978.

== Personal life ==
In 1933, Magnusson married Wera Ericsson (1908–2003), the daughter of office clerk Erik Ericsson and Emilia Johansson. He was the father of Bo (born 1938), Gunnel (born 1940), Göran (born 1942), and Hans (born 1944).

== Death ==
Magnusson died on 24 November 1987 and was buried at Sundbyberg Cemetery in Sundbyberg Municipality.

== Awards and decorations ==
- (Sweden) Commander of the Order of the Polar Star

== Honours ==
- Member of the Royal Swedish Academy of War Sciences (1949)
- Member of the Royal Swedish Academy of Engineering Sciences (1957)
- Honorary member of the Royal Swedish Society of Naval Sciences (1971)

== Bibliography ==
- Magnusson, Torsten, ed. (1959). Fakta om atomvapen [Facts about nuclear weapons] (in Swedish). Stockholm: Bonnier. SELIBR 1312405.
- Blume, Adzer; Magnusson, Torsten (1956). Atomer [Atoms] (in Swedish). Stockholm: Svenska bokförlaget (Bonnier). SELIBR 1591924.
- Magnusson, Torsten; Hedvall, J. Arvid (1955). Atom-Bomben,-Staub,-Energie: Zwei Schriften. Autor. deutsche Übers. und Bearb. von Eduard Justi. Mit einem Geleitwort von E.h.E.W.Lotz. [Illustr.] (in German). Aachen. SELIBR 2892928.
- Magnusson, Torsten (1952). Manne Siegbahn 1886-: [Rubr.] (in Swedish). Stockholm. SELIBR 2892927.
- Magnusson, Torsten (1951). Atombomber och radioaktiva stridsmedel [Atomic bombs and radioactive weapons]. Civilförsvarsstyrelsens småskrifter. Stockholm: [Seelig]. SELIBR 1442966.
- Magnusson, Torsten (1948). Edsbygdens mejeriförening: Tio års verksamhet : 1938-1948 [Edsbygden's dairy company: Ten years of operation: 1938-1948] (in Swedish). Mellerud: Hällström. SELIBR 1418651.
- Magnusson, Torsten (1938). Investigations into absorption spectra in the extremely soft X-ray region and comparison between different mountings of the plate with concave grating. Nova acta Regiae Societatis Scientiarum Upsaliensis, 0029-5000; Ser.4,11:3. Uppsala. OCLC 10683753. SELIBR 1374319.

Government offices
Preceded by Martin Fehrm	Director-General of the National Defence Research Institute; 1968–1974	Succeeded by Nils-Henrik Lundquist
