= Hugo Larsson =

Hugo Larsson may refer to:

- Hugo Larsson (engineer) (1906–1986), Swedish engineer and civil servant
- Hugo Larsson (footballer) (born 2004), Swedish footballer
