= Martin Fehrm =

Swedish engineer and civil servant

- Born: Erik Martin Fehrm; 8 March 1910; Järna, Sweden
- Died: 6 August 2001 (aged 91); Stockholm, Sweden
- Education: Royal Institute of Technology
- Engineering career
- Discipline: Electrical engineering
- Employer: National Defence Research Institute
- Projects: Swedish nuclear weapons program

Erik Martin Fehrm (8 March 1910 – 6 August 2001) was a Swedish engineer and civil servant. Fehrm, after completing his studentexamen, pursued studies at the Royal Institute of Technology, graduating in electrical engineering in 1932. Driven by a passion for radio technology, he joined the Royal Swedish Army Materiel Administration in 1933. During World War II, Fehrm served as a 3rd degree flight engineer in the Royal Swedish Air Force Materiel Administration, contributing to eco-radio development and investigating advanced military equipment. Post-war, he held significant roles, including heading a department at the Swedish National Defence Research Institute and later serving as its Director General until 1968. Fehrm continued his influential career as the Director General of the National Swedish Board for Technical Development from 1968 to 1971 and contributed to various national research councils and associations until the mid-1980s.

== Early life ==
Fehrm was born on 8 March 1910 in Järna, Kopparberg County, Sweden, the son of Fritz Fehrm, a bookseller, and his wife Klara (née Matsson). He passed studentexamen in Falun and initiated studies at the KTH Royal Institute of Technology in Stockholm, from which he graduated with a degree in electrical engineering in 1932.

== Career ==
With a keen interest in radio technology, he received the following year employment at the Royal Swedish Army Materiel Administration. In 1940, Fehrm came as a 3rd degree flight engineer to the Royal Swedish Air Force Materiel Administration, where he would stay until the war was over. During the war years he developed into an expert on eco-radio and participated actively in the special working group that had been created for the area within the Swedish Board of Inventions (Statens uppfinnarnämnd). His expertise was also used for the investigation of advanced military equipment, which ended in the country crashed airplane or in any other way, for example the Bäckebo rocket. Fehrm became 2nd degree flight engineer in 1942. Fehrm was head of department at the Swedish National Defence Research Institute (FOA) from 1945 to 1957 when he was appointed Director General of FOA. Fehrm held this post until 1968. He was then Director General of the National Swedish Board for Technical Development (Styrelsen för teknisk utveckling, STU) from 1968 to 1971.

He became a member of the National Board of the Swedish Institutes of Technology (Överstyrelsen för de tekniska högskolorna) in 1959. Fehrm was chairman of the Swedish Natural Science Research Council (Statens naturvetenskapliga forskningsråd) from 1965 to 1977, and the Stamnätsnämnden from 1966 to 1985. He was a member of the Swedish Government Research Advisory Board (Forskningsberedningen) from 1962 to 1978, the Miljövårdsberedningen from 1968 to 1977, and the Swedish Transport Research Delegation (Transportforskningsdelegationen) from 1971 to 1982. Furthermore, Fehrm was chairman of the board of the AB Atomenergi from 1969 to 1976, chairman of the Swedish Association of Graduate Engineers (Svenska Teknologföreningen, SvTF) from 1972 to 1973, and 1st vice chairman of the Swedish Association of Graduate Engineers (Sveriges civilingenjörsförbund) from 1974 to 1977.

== Personal life ==
He was married to Ragna Fägersten (born 1912), the daughter of Helge Fägersten and Signe Janzon.

== Awards and decorations ==
- (Sweden) Illis quorum, 12th size (1977)
- (Sweden) Commander Grand Cross of the Order of the Polar Star (17 November 1969)
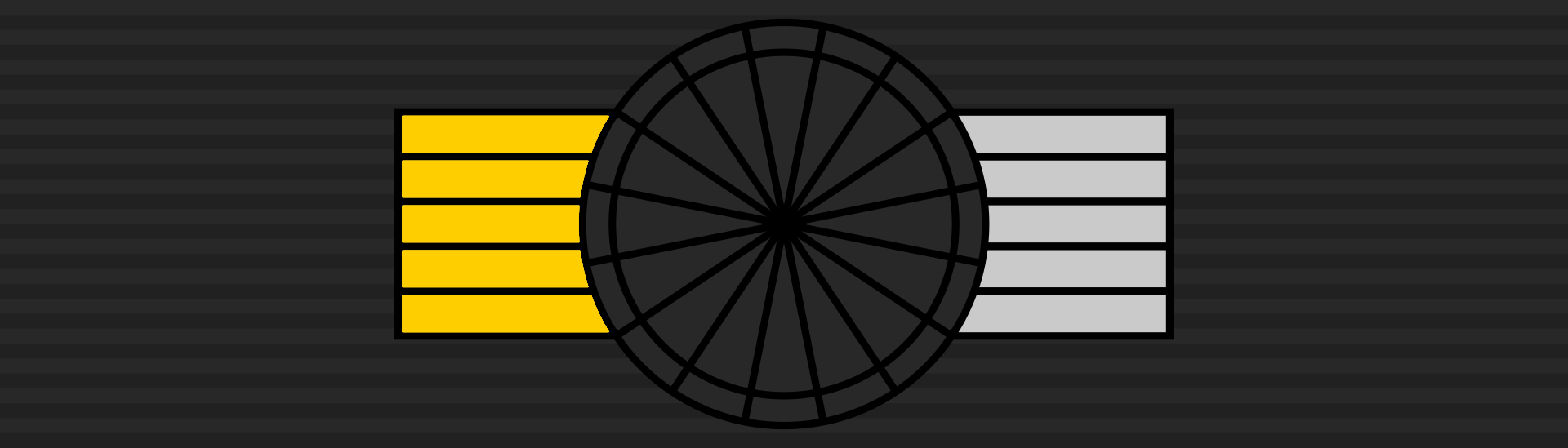
- (Sweden) Commander 1st Class of the Order of the Polar Star (24 November 1960)
- (Sweden) Knight of the Order of Vasa (1945)

== Honours ==
- Member of the Royal Swedish Academy of War Sciences (1949)
- Member of the Royal Swedish Academy of Engineering Sciences (1958)
- Technical honorary doctor, Chalmers University of Technology (1963)

== Bibliography ==
- Agrell, Jan; Fehrm, Martin (1960). Totalförsvarets psykoteknologiska problem. Rapport - Militärpsykologiska institutet, 0544-1803; 2 (in Swedish). Stockholm: Militärpsykologiska institutet. SELIBR 1564965.
- Fehrm, Martin (1965). Försvarsforskning och långtidsplanering. Försvar i nutid, 0046-4643; 1965:6 (in Swedish). Stockholm: Centralförb. Folk och försvar. SELIBR 874517.
- Fehrm, Martin; Sundvik, Ivar; Swanstein, Stig (1968). Vissa avvägningsfrågor inom totalförsvaret: studie. Stencilerat betänkande / Försvarsdepartementet; 1967:15 (in Swedish). Stockholm: Försvarsdep. SELIBR 2200802.
- Fehrm, Martin; Thorén, Ragnar (1969). Picture atlas of the Arctic: av kommendörkapten Ragnar Thorén : [recension] (in Swedish). Stockholm. SELIBR 12309571.
- Fehrm, Martin; Karlsson, Sören (1991). Lyftet: tio år med Trygghetsrådets idéstipendier (in Swedish). Stockholm: Trygghetsrådet SAF-PTK. ISBN 91-87928-06-X. SELIBR 7767765.

Government offices
| Preceded by Hugo Larsson as Chief Director | Director-General of the National Defence Research Institute; 1957–1968 | Succeeded by Torsten Magnusson |
