= Hugo Larsson (engineer) =

Swedish engineer and civil servant

- Born: Nils Hugo Charles Larsson; 18 December 1906; Brunnby, Sweden
- Died: 25 February 1986 (aged 79); Stockholm, Sweden
- Education: Royal Institute of Technology
- Engineering career
- Discipline: Electrical engineering
- Employer: National Defence Research Institute
- Projects: Swedish nuclear weapons program

Nils Hugo Charles Larsson (18 December 1906 – 25 February 1986) was a Swedish engineer and civil servant. He was Chief Director of the Swedish National Defence Research Institute from 1952 to 1957.

== Early life ==
Larsson was born on 18 December 1906 in Brunnby Parish, Malmöhus County, Sweden the son of Nils Larsson, a sea captain, and his wife Hildur (née Elfverson). Larsson graduated from the Royal Institute of Technology in 1928.

== Career ==
Larsson worked as an engineer at the Swedish Board of Telecommunication (Telestyrelsen) from 1928. Larsson was then technical officer at its Radio Division (Radiobyrån) from 1938 to 1945 and associate professor (laborator) at the Swedish National Defence Research Institute from 1945 to 1950. He was then head of the Electro Department at the Royal Swedish Air Force Materiel Administration from 1950 to 1952. Larsson was chief director and head of the Swedish National Defence Research Institute from 1952 to 1957 and director general in 1957. He was then technical director at Svenska AB Philips from 1957 to 1964.

Larsson was a board member of the HIFAB from 1965 to 1966 and chairman from 1967. He was a member of the Swedish Commission for the Introduction of Right-Hand Driving (Statens högertrafikkommission) from 1963 to 1967. Larsson was chairman of the Royal Swedish Academy of Engineering Sciences' committee for a more effective energy use from 1972 to 1974 and became an honorary doctor of technology at the Chalmers University of Technology in 1980. Larsson also wrote essays about radio, radar and radio navigation in Swedish and foreign journals. He was the creator of "Hugo's fireplace" (Hugos braskamin) and worked as a consultant in energy, heating and ventilation.

== Personal life ==
In 1941 he married Bea Sonesson (1907–1981), the daughter of the engineer Olof Sonesson and Ida (née Möller). He was the father of Gunnar (born 1942), Ove (born 1944) and, Bertil (born 1948).

== Death ==
Larsson died on 25 February 1986 and was buried at Bromma Cemetery in Stockholm.

== Awards and decorations ==
- (Sweden) Commander of the Order of the Polar Star (23 November 1956)
- (Sweden) Knight of the Order of Vasa (1945)
- (France) Knight of the Legion of Honour

== Honours ==
- Member of the Royal Swedish Academy of War Sciences (1953)
- Honorary member of the Royal Swedish Society of Naval Sciences (1957)
- Member of the Royal Swedish Academy of Engineering Sciences (1962)

Government offices
Preceded by Albert Björkeson	Chief Director of the National Defence Research Institute; 1952–1957	Succeeded by Martin Fehrm as Director-General
