= Saab 36 =

Cancelled Swedish supersonic bomber aircraft

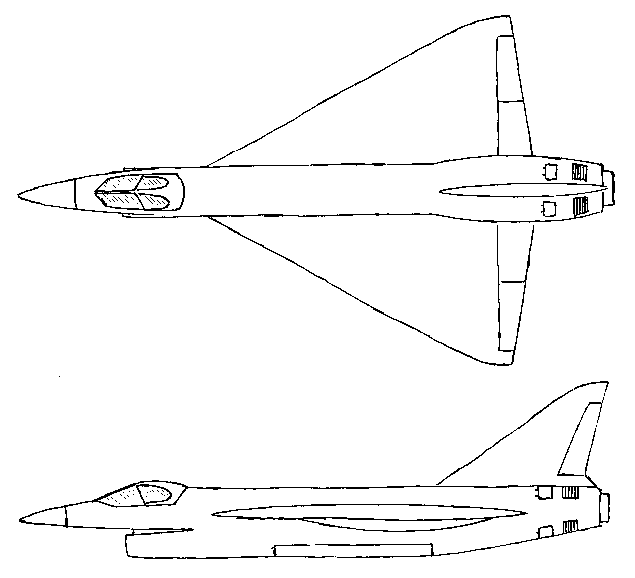
- Saab Project 1300-76, the finalised configuration.

General information
- Type: Bomber
- Manufacturer: Saab AB
- Status: Cancelled project
- Number built: none

The Saab 36 (also known as Projekt 1300) was a cancelled Swedish supersonic bomber planned by Saab AB during the 1950s. The aircraft was intended to be able to carry an 800 kg free-falling nuclear weapon, but the Swedish nuclear weapons program was cancelled in the 1960s; the plans for the bomber had been cancelled in 1957. The Saab 36 was to be fitted with delta wings, as was the Saab 35 Draken fighter. The engine was to be a version of the British Bristol Olympus turbojet, the same engine powering the Avro Vulcan jet bomber.

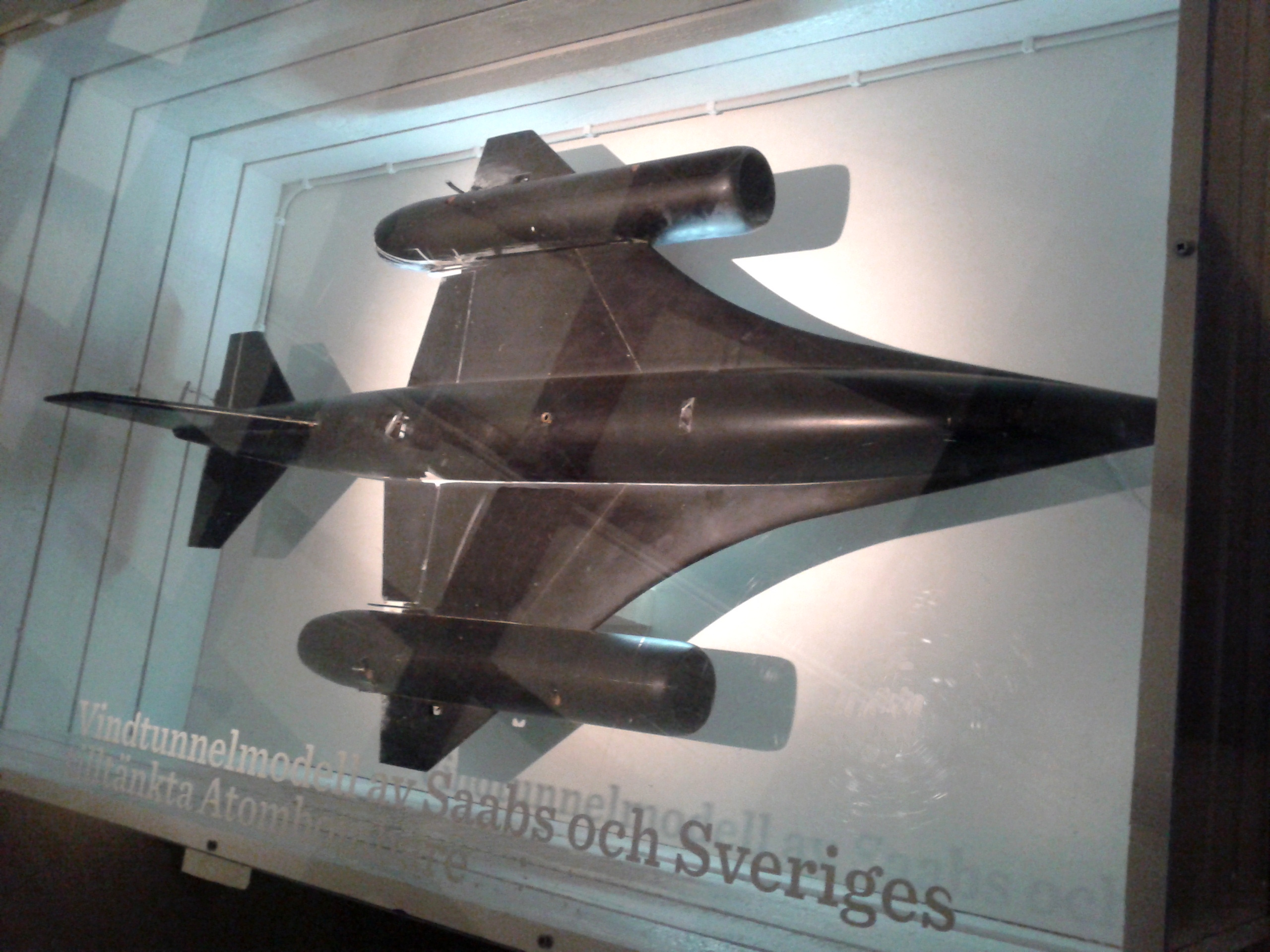
Saab Project 1300-71D wind tunnel model used in the studies.

== Specifications (as designed) ==
General characteristics

- Crew: one pilot
- Length: 17 m (55 ft 9 in)
- Wingspan: 9.6 m (31 ft 6 in)
- Wing area: 54 m^{2} (581 sq ft)
- Empty weight: 9,000 kg (19,840 lb)
- Gross weight: 15,000 kg (33,070 lb)
- Powerplant: 2 × Bristol Olympus , 44 kN (10,000 lbf) thrust each

Performance

- Maximum speed: Mach 2.14
- Service ceiling: 18,000 m (59,100 ft)

Armament

- 1 × 600–800 kg (1 300–1 800 lb) free-fall nuclear bomb

== See also ==
Aircraft of comparable role, configuration, and era

- BAC TSR-2
- Convair B-58 Hustler
- Dassault Mirage IV
- North American A-5 Vigilante
- Tupolev Tu-22

== Bibliography ==
- Berns, Lennart (April 1991), "A36 – SAABs atombombare avslöjad" [SAAB atom bomber unmasked], Flygrevyn (in Swedish), no. 4.
