= Lars-Erik Tammelin =

Swedish chemist

- Born: 16 March 1923; Stockholm, Sweden
- Died: 3 January 1991 (aged 67); Stockholm, Sweden
- Resting place: Bromma Cemetery
- Education: Stockholm University College
- Father: Erik Tammelin
- Scientific career
- Fields: Choline esters
- Workplaces: Swedish National Defence Research Institute
- Thesis: Choline esters : substrate and inhibitors of cholinesterases (1958)

Lars-Erik Tammelin (16 March 1923 – 3 January 1991) was a Swedish chemist, defence researcher and civil servant. Tammelin served as Director-General of the Swedish National Defence Research Institute from 1984 to 1985.

== Early life ==
Tammelin was born on 16 March 1923 in Stockholm, Sweden, the son of Supreme Court Justice Erik Tammelin and his wife Elsa (née Palm).

== Career ==
Tammelin, who was an organic chemist, was recruited to the Swedish National Defence Research Institute (FOA) in 1950 for research on nerve gas and nerve gas countermeasures. At this time, FOA (whose previous chemical warfare activities had focussed on mustard gas and other World War I-style compounds) had become aware that large quantities of nerve gas, primarily Tabun, had been stockpiled during World War II. The mechanism of action of the nerve gases were found to be linked to their chemical similarity to the neurotransmitter acetylcholine and their ability to block the enzyme cholinesterase. Much of Tammelin's work was therefore focussed on choline esters. In 1958, he defended a PhD thesis based on this work at Stockholm University College. The same year he became Docent in organic chemistry at Stockholm University College.

The esters that form analogues to the V-Series of nerve agents are sometimes referred to as "Tammelin's esters". Succinylcholine, one of the compounds synthesized by Tammelin in his search for nerve gas countermeasures, was put into use as a muscle relaxant for use during general anaesthesia surgery under the brand name Celocurin.

In 1961, Tammelin became head of the chemical-medical division at FOA, when he succeeded Gustaf Ljunggren. Tammelin became a medical honorary doctorate at Karolinska Institutet in 1973. He was professor and research director of the National Food Administration from 1975 to 1982 and Director-General of FOA from 1984 to 1985.

== Personal life ==
In 1946 he married Isa Nilson (born 1922), the daughter of factory manager Nils Konrad Nilson and Sigrid Johansson.

== Death ==
Tammelin died on 3 January 1991 and was buried at Bromma Cemetery on 10 April 1991.

== Honours ==
- Honorary Doctor of Medicine (1973)

== Bibliography ==
- Tammelin, Lars-Erik (1958). Choline esters: substrate and inhibitors of cholinesterases. Stockholm. SELIBR 9470776.
- Jacksén, Stig; Markkula, Henrik; Tammelin, Lars-Erik (1968). Biologiska och kemiska stridsmedel [Biological and chemical weapons]. Strategisk bulletin, 99-0393296-0; 4:1968:3 (in Swedish). Stockholm. SELIBR 623709.

Government offices
Preceded by Nils-Henrik Lundquist	Director-General of the National Defence Research Institute; 1984–1985	Succeeded by Bo Rybeck
