= Military Physics Institute =

Swedish research institute

Military Physics Institute (Swedish: Militärfysiska institutet, MFI) was a Swedish research institution established in 1941 to 1945. It was amalgamated into the Swedish National Defence Research Institute in 1945.

== History ==
The initiative for the establishment of the Military Physics Institute was taken in 1939 when the leaders of the country's physical institutions joined forces to make more effective use of the physical research results for military purposes. The Military Physics Institute was established in 1940 by the Swedish National Committee for Physics (Svenska nationalkommitten för fysik) and the year after state funding for the operation was applied. Research within the Military Physics Institute focused on the development of new weapons of defense. These include surveys of the military use of infrared radiation as well as the problems of shaped charge. An area in Södertörn near Grindsjön was donated by Olof Arrhenius, at which the institute built a test station for the operations. The Military Physics Institute was amalgamated into department 2 in connection with the formation of the Swedish National Defence Research Institute on 1 July 1945.

== Directors ==
- 1945–1945 – Carl Gustav Jennergren
