= Swedish National Defence Research Institute =

Former agency of the Swedish government

National Defence Research Institute
- Försvarets forskningsanstalt (FOA)

Agency overview
- Formed: 1945
- Preceding agencies: Försvarsväsendets kemiska anstalt; Military Physics Institute; Statens uppfinnarnämnd
- Dissolved: 31 December 2000
- Superseding agency: Defence Research Agency
- Headquarters: Ursvik and Sorunda, Sweden
- Parent department: Ministry of Defence

Swedish National Defence Research Institute (Swedish: Försvarets forskningsanstalt, FOA) was a Swedish government agency in defense research existing from 1945 to 31 December 2000. It was amalgamated with the National Aeronautical Research Institute (FFA) into the Swedish Defence Research Agency (FOI) which was established on 1 January 2001.

== History ==
The National Defence Research Institute (FOA) was established in 1945 (Instruction TS C:II No. 24), and took over operations at the Swedish Armed Forces Chemical Institute (Försvarsväsendets kemiska anstalt, FKA), the Military Physics Institute and the Telecommunications Technical Working Group of the Swedish Board of Inventions (Statens uppfinnarnämnds teletekniska arbetsgrupp, SUN), that is, essentially all technical and scientific research outside the industry. FOA was organized in three research departments, FOA 1 chemistry/medicine, FOA 2 general physics and FOA 3 telecommunications and an office.

In 1959 FOA 4 (nuclear physics and nuclear chemistry) was added. A special institution for operations analysis, planning and investigation FOA P, was added in 1958 and was renamed the planning agency in 1962. In 1958 the office was reorganized into the administrative bureau. In 1962, an institution for materials research was added and in 1965 the Defence Telecommunications Technology Laboratory (Försvarets teletekniska laboratorium) was separated from the FOA 3 as a separate unit.

A major reorganization occurred on 1 July 1974. After this the FOA was organized in a central office, which accounted for among other thing the projections, management, staffing and education issues, and five main departments, FOA 1-5:

- FOA 1: armed forces studies, environmental and social studies, security policy and operations analysis and systems analysis
- FOA 2: general physics, nuclear device technology, EDP, material research, protection technology, etc.
- FOA 3: optics, electronics, acoustics, radar and signals intelligence
- FOA 4: biochemistry, microbiology, chemistry and radiac
- FOA 5: behavioral sciences, biotechnology and medicine

The central office was divided in 1976 into three parts: central planning, administrative bureau and staff administrative bureau. These were later reorganized into two: the Planning and development unit and the management unit. It was amalgamated with the National Aeronautical Research Institute (FFA) into the Swedish Defence Research Agency (FOI) which was established on 1 January 2001.

== Heraldry ==
The coat of arms of the Swedish National Defence Research Institute. Blazon: "Azure, a winged two-bladed propeller surmounting a sword and an anchor in saltire. The shield encircled by a chaplet, half laurel leaves and half oak leaves, all or".

== Heads ==
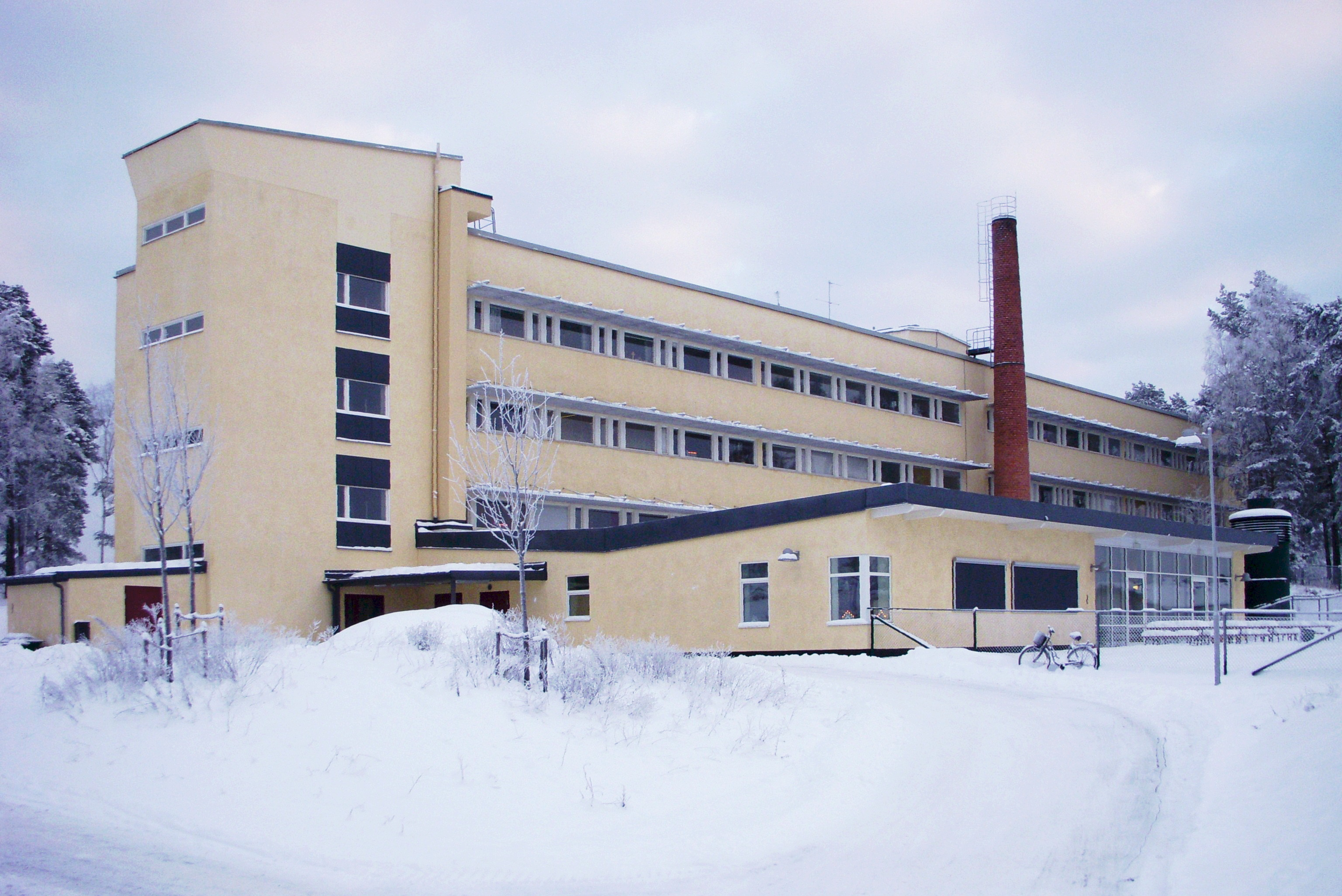
FOA's old office building in Ursvik, Sundbyberg Municipality.

FOA has had the following directors:

Chief Directors (Överdirektörer)

- 1945–1952: Albert Björkeson
- 1952–1957: Hugo Larsson (Director General from 1957)

Directors-General

- 1957–1968: Martin Fehrm
- 1968–1974: Torsten Magnusson
- 1974–1984: Nils-Henrik Lundquist
- 1984–1985: Lars-Erik Tammelin
- 1985–1994: Bo Rybeck
- 1 July 1994 – 2000: Bengt Anderberg
