= Grindsjön =

Lake in Sweden

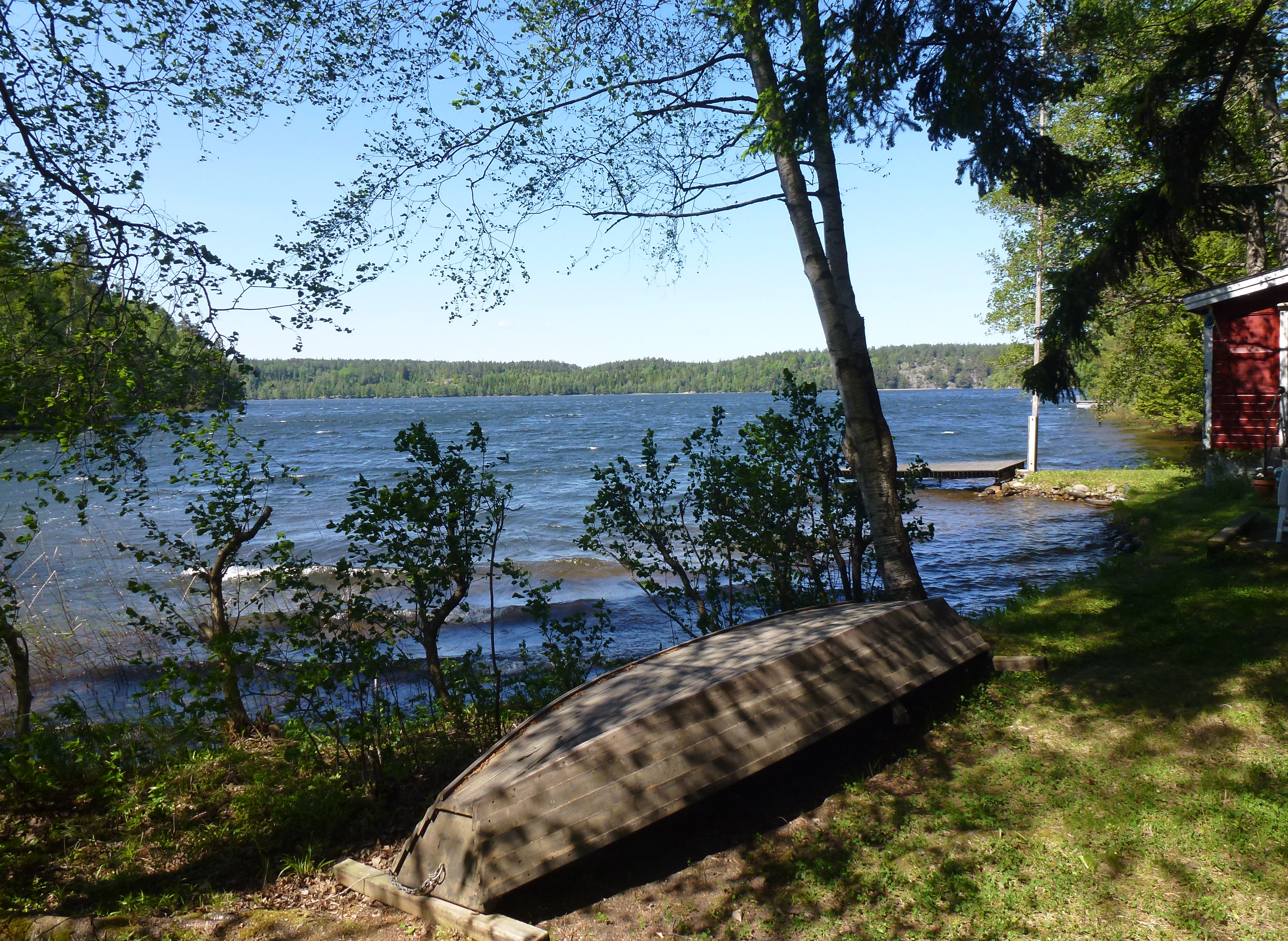
- View of Grindsjön from the south

- Location within Stockholm
- Coordinates: 59°5′6″N 17°52′18″E
- Basin countries: Sweden

Grindsjön is a lake in Stockholm county, Södermanland, Sweden.
