= Nuclear power in Denmark =

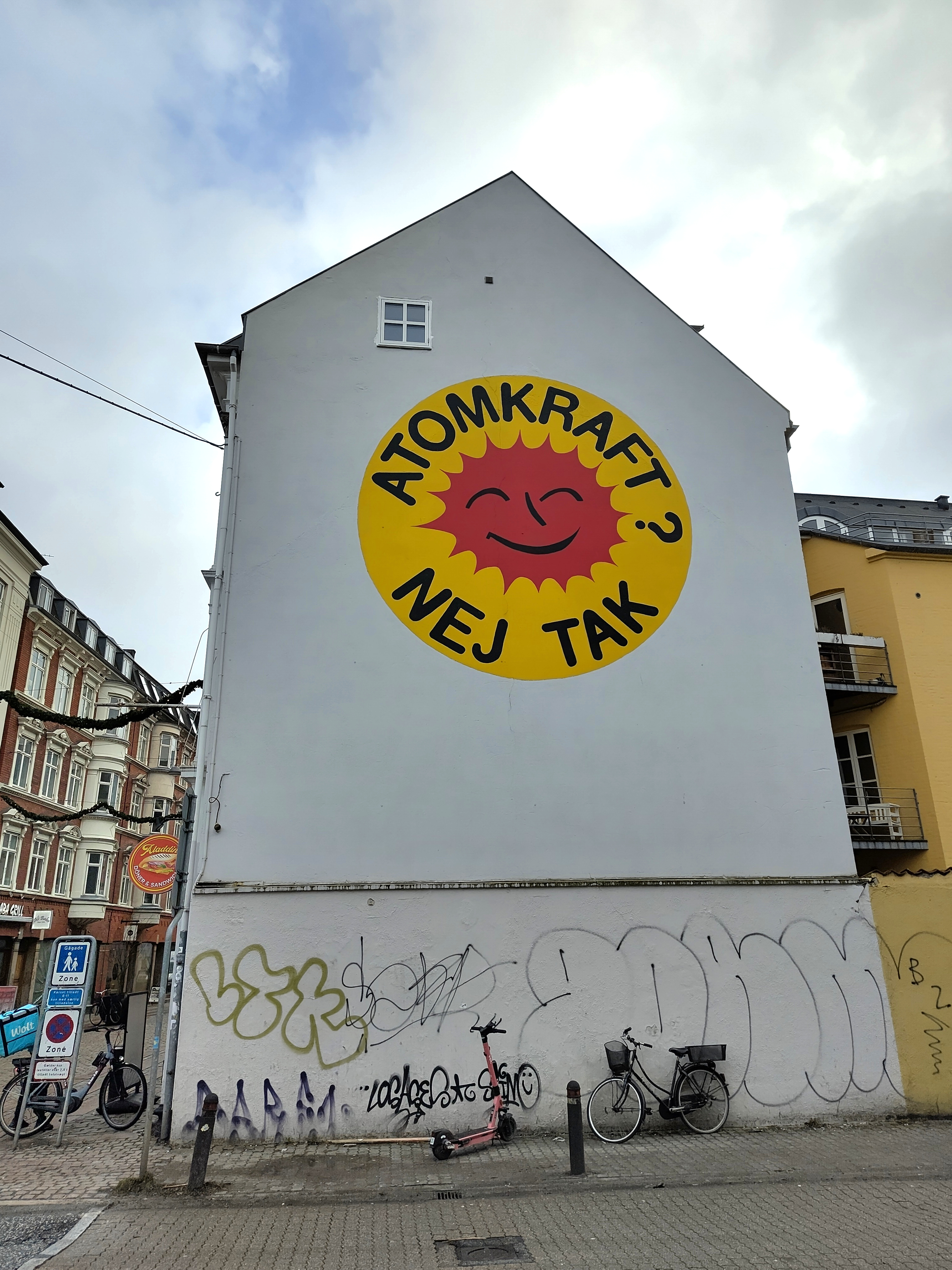
A mural of the Smiling Sun anti-nuclear symbol from 1976 on Vestergade in Aarhus. The text on the symbol translates to "Nuclear power? No thanks"

Denmark imports but does not produce nuclear energy, which is in accordance with a 1985 law passed by the Danish parliament, prohibiting power production from nuclear energy. In 2014 and 2015, imported nuclear power accounted for 3-4% of electricity consumption in Denmark.

Beginning in the 1950s, the Danish government funded efforts to research and establish nuclear power plants in Denmark through the Danish Atomic Energy Commission and the Risø National Laboratory. Anti-nuclear sentiment within Denmark increased in the early 1970s following the Three Mile Island accident and the construction of the controversial Barsebäck Nuclear Power Plant. Protests made by the Organisationen til Oplysning om Atomkraft (English: Organisation for Nuclear Information; OOA) and dissent among the majority of voters led the Danish government to halt the rollout of a nuclear power program in 1976, and eventually prohibit the generation of nuclear power in 1985.

In reaction to climate change, the 21st century has seen renewed interest in Denmark in nuclear energy production as an alternative to the use of fossil fuels. In August 2023, a Gallup poll showed that 55% of Denmark's population views nuclear power favourably, compared to 26% against.

== History ==
=== Post-war research ===
Denmark invested in nuclear research relatively late compared to other European nations due to American and British reluctance to allow Denmark's most prominent scientist, Niels Bohr, to divulge the knowledge he gained during the Manhattan project. Bohr was acutely aware of this fact, and as the rest of the scientific establishment followed his lead at the time, very little progress was made until the early 1950s. Following the 1953 Atoms for Peace speech, these tight restrictions were relaxed. After a 1955 American sponsored campaign from the US Information Service called "Atomet i Hverdagen" (English: The Atom in Everyday Life), the majority of Danes anticipated that nuclear energy would be "more of a boon than a curse to mankind".

In December 1955, the Danish Atomic Energy Commission (Danish: Atomenergikommissionen, AEK) was established. The Commission consisted of 24 members, with Bohr as its chairman, and had oversight over the development and promotion of nuclear energy in Denmark. The AEK established a nuclear research site in Risø which was officially inaugurated on 6 June 1958.

=== Risø National Laboratory ===
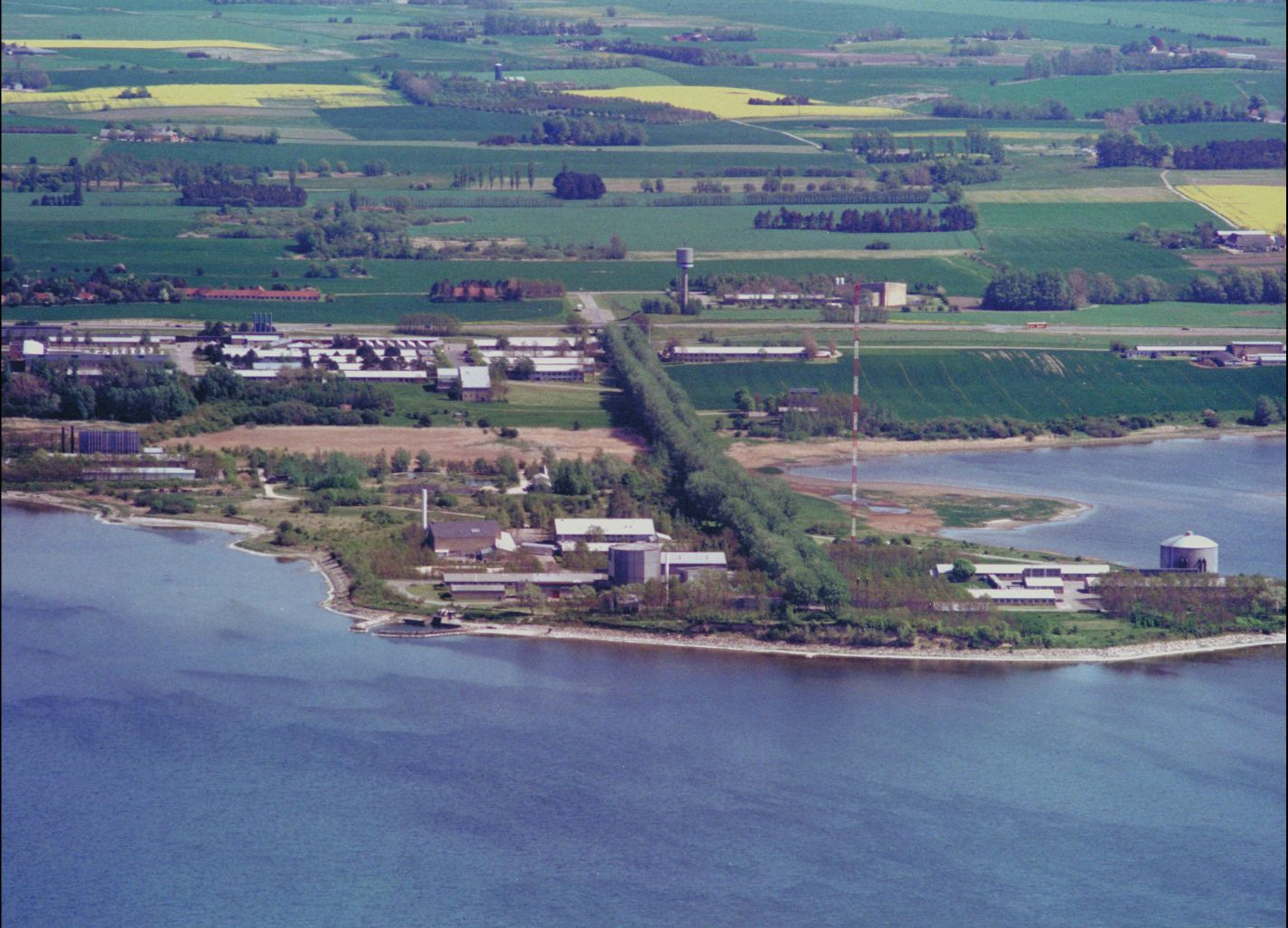
The former Risø National Laboratory on the edge of Roskilde Fjord, which was the site of Denmarks only nuclear reactors between 1957 and 2003. The two outermost cylindrical buildings on the peninsula contained the reactors DR-2 and DR-3.

In its first three decades, the Risø National Laboratory's activities were centred around research on the peaceful use of nuclear energy. Between 1957 and 1960, three research nuclear reactors opened at Risø, which had been imported from or based on designs from the United States and United Kingdom: DR-1, DR-2 and DR-3 (DR: Danish Reactor, Dansk Reaktor). These reactors were not designed to produce power, but to be used for the training of power plant technicians and for producing radioisotopes for scientific and medical use. The institute also attempted to develop its own reactor design to be the model for Danish power reactors—an organic liquid cooled, heavy water moderated design called the Deuterium Organic Reactor (DOR). However, the institute failed to convince Danish power utilities to support it and their plans were never realised. Later attempts to partner with Sweden's AB Atomenergi to develop a heavy water reactor also failed due to a lack of collaboration and economic viability.

Following increasing anti-nuclear sentiment within Denmark in the early 1970s, the Danish government halted the rollout of a nuclear power program in 1976, until a clear plan for the disposal of nuclear waste could be formalised. As a result the laboratory at Risø found itself at a standstill, especially after the prohibition of nuclear energy in 1985, and began shifting its focus towards research into other energy sources. By the turn of the 21st century, Risø was particularly noted for its research related to wind energy, solid-oxide fuel cells, and climate change.

Beginning in 2003, the three nuclear research reactors at the former Risø National Laboratory were decommissioned along with the adjacent hot cell facility, fuel fabrication plant, and nuclear waste management plant. As of 2024, the decommissioning process of DR-3, the hot cells, and the nuclear waste management plant is still ongoing. The decommissioning of DR-1 (completed 2006), DR-2 (completed 2008), and fuel fabrication plant (completed 2023) has been completed.

The laboratory employed about 700 staff in 2005, at which point it was a research institute under the Danish Ministry of Science, Technology and Innovation. In 2007, the laboratory was merged into the Technical University of Denmark and was renamed into the Risø National Laboratory for Sustainable Energy in 2007. In 2012, it was transformed into DTU Risø Campus, an additional campus of the Technical University of Denmark.

=== Anti-nuclear sentiment and nuclear ban ===
The Smiling Sun symbol, developed by the Danish anti-nuclear group OOA in 1975. It states "Nuclear Power? No thanks" in Danish.

The 1973 oil crisis brought the development of nuclear power in Denmark back into public focus. Concerned about the safety of nuclear power plants, their economics and the wider threat to world peace posed by nuclear technology, the OOA was founded in January 1974 by students in Copenhagen. They campaigned against the construction of nuclear power facilities in Denmark, and instead advocated for greater use of coal, natural gas, and biogas, along with energy-saving measures and an increased focus on the development of wind and solar technology. Anne Lund created the Smiling Sun anti-nuclear symbol to support OOA's cause, which has since gained global use among anti-nuclear advocates.

The OOA arranged peaceful demonstrations and information campaigns. Following the opening of the Barsebäck Nuclear Power Plant in Sweden, just 20km from Copenhagen, they began organizing demonstrations in front of the Swedish Embassy and producing scientific publications on the potential dangers of the plant. In response, pro-nuclear proponents established the Réel Energi Oplysning (English: Real Energy Information; REO), which was composed primarily of nuclear experts from the Risø laboratory. Their counter-publications affirming the safety of the Barsebäck plant made less of an impact than the OOA's efforts, and the broader Danish public remained opposed. In 1976, approximately 10,000 people marched in a demonstration against the plant, and a second march in 1977 gathered nearly 20,000. In 1979, the OOA collected more than 300,000 signatures in an open letter to the Prime Minister, Anker Jørgensen.

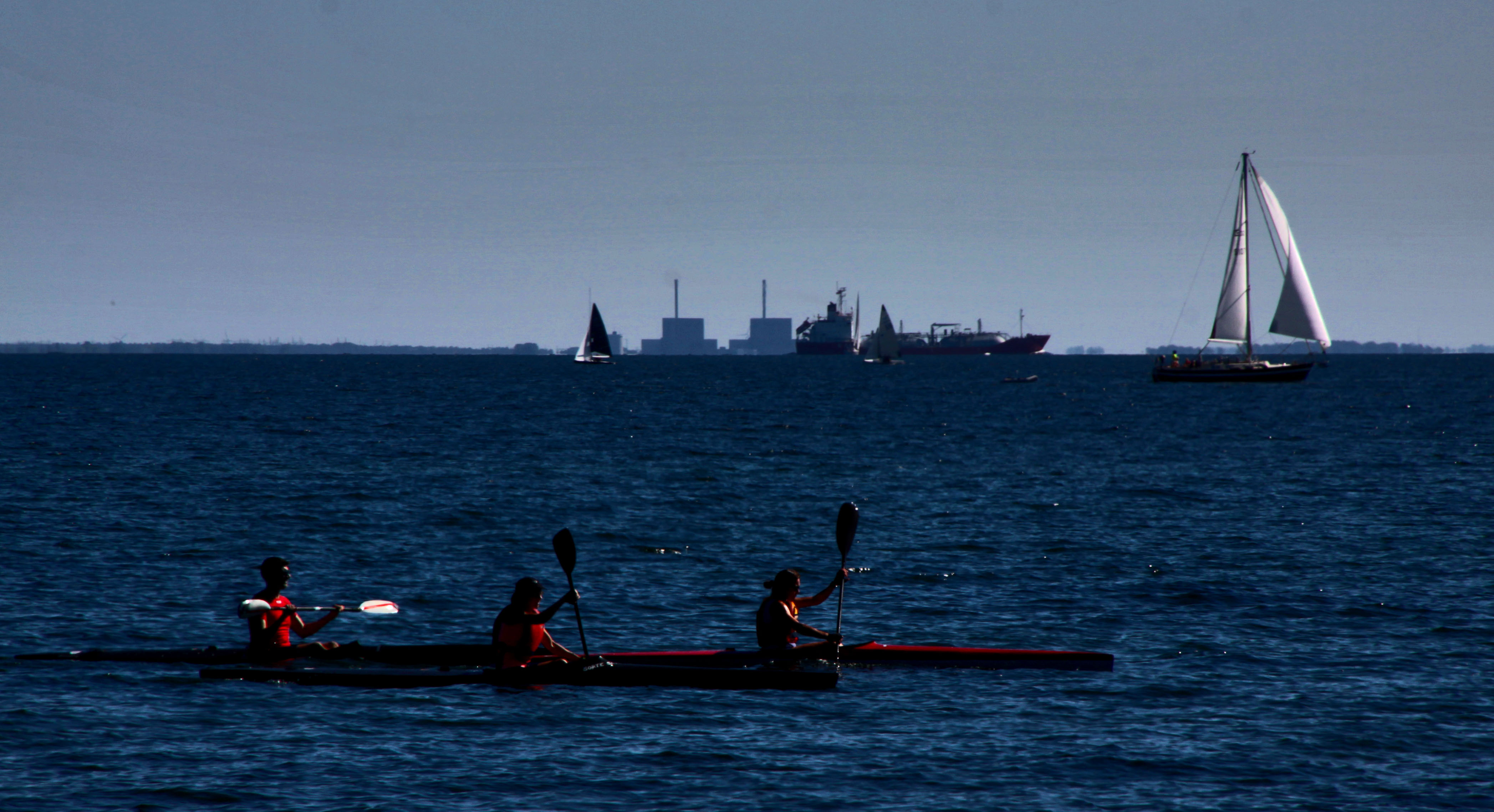
View of the Barsebäck nuclear power plant towers from the other side of the Øresund in Charlottenlund, Copenhagen.

The Barsebäck plant, the Chernobyl disaster, and the Three Mile Island accident lead to increasing anti-nuclear sentiments in Denmark, spurring energy debates in the Folketing. In August 1978, a march arranged by the OOA to planned reactor sites was attended by approximately 50,000 people. Following the march, option polls stated that just 32% of Danes were in favor of nuclear energy production, while 53% were against it. In March 1985, the Folketing voted to remove nuclear power from the nation's energy planning, effectively banning the generation of electricity from nuclear reactors. The fifteen locations across Denmark which had been reserved for possible nuclear plants were then scraped.

Instead of investing in nuclear power, Denmark converted oil plants to coal and built new coal power plants in order to meet the nations energy demands. As a result, Denmark was the world's second largest importer of coal for several years, importing 11–12 million tons per year. Denmark has increasingly focused on renewable energy sources such as wind energy to reduce the country's dependence on coal power.

=== 21st-century revival ===
In 2015, two Danish companies related to nuclear energy were established: Seaborg Technologies and Copenhagen Atomics. Both are private companies that work on the development of molten-salt reactors, where the fissile material is mixed into molten salt, having a significantly lower output effect than conventional, commercially available nuclear power reactors. They are smaller in size, and both companies are therefore producing small modular reactors.

The issue of introducing nuclear power in Denmark has been revived since 2019, when the 2019 United Nations Climate Change Conference and the state of the climate showed a need for energy sources which produced fewer greenhouse gasses. In reaction to the popular "Atomkraft? Nej tak" (English: Nuclear Power? No thanks) slogan, the phrase "Atomkraft, ja tak" (English: Nuclear Power? Yes thanks) has gained usage. In March 2024 the Minister of Climate, Energy and Utilities, Lars Aagaard, announced that test reactors may be built in Denmark, provided that they do not produce electricity. The Technical University of Denmark, which now possesses the former facilities of the Risø National Laboratory, reestablished formal research into nuclear power in Denmark in 2024.

== Reactors ==
Site	Unit No.	Type	Status	Capacity	Operating years	Closed	Full decommissioning (Note: Year of final approval of decommissioning operations by the supervising agency and release of the decommissioned nuclear site to unrestricted use as a "greenfield" site)
Risø National Laboratory	DR1	AHR	Decommissioned	2 kW	1957–2001	2003	2006
Risø National Laboratory	DR2	Pool reactor	Decommissioned	5 MW	1958–1975	2003	2008
Risø National Laboratory	DR3	DIDO	Decommissioned	10 MW	1960–2000	2003	Ongoing

== See also ==
- Energy in Denmark
- Electricity sector in Denmark
- Nuclear power in the European Union
