= Nuclear power in Sweden =

Nuclear power plants in Sweden (view)
Active plants
Closed plants
Unfinished plants

The electricity sector in Sweden has three operational nuclear power plants with 6 operational nuclear reactors, which produce about 30% of the country's electricity. The nation's largest power station, Forsmark Nuclear Power Plant, has three reactors producing 3.3 GW and 14% of Sweden's electricity.

Sweden formerly had a nuclear phase-out policy, aiming to end nuclear power generation in Sweden by 2010. On 5 February 2009, the Government of Sweden announced an agreement allowing for the replacement of existing reactors, effectively ending the phase-out policy.

In June 2023, the new Kristersson Cabinet established after the country's 2022 election voted to switch the national energy target from 100% renewable electricity by 2045 to 100% fossil fuel-free electricity by 2045, a move seen as supporting and extending the ongoing use of nuclear power in the country. At the time, hydro, nuclear, and wind power already produced 98% of Sweden's electricity, with the government aiming to increase electricity production from carbon-free sources to meet an estimated doubling of national electricity consumption by 2040. In 2025, nuclear power produced 27% of the country’s electricity.

== History ==
Electricity production in Sweden by type

View chart definition.
Nuclear power production in Sweden by reactor [TWh/yr]

=== Early history ===
Sweden began research into nuclear energy in 1947 with the establishment of the Atomic Energy Company, AB Atomenergi, which originated in the ongoing military research and development at the Defence Institute FOA. In 1954, the country built its first small research heavy water reactor, the R1 nuclear reactor. The R1 was dismantled in 1970. It was followed by two heavy water reactors: Ågesta or R3 nuclear reactor, a small heat and power reactor in 1964, and Marviken or R4 nuclear reactor which was finished but never operated (was never loaded with nuclear fuel), due to several safety issues. The R3 reactor stopped operations in 1974 and is to be demolished with work beginning in 2020 and ending 2025. The R4 project was cancelled in 1970, with the site being used in non-nuclear capacity since. Also a reactor named the R2 nuclear reactor, the second nuclear reactor in Sweden, was built in Studsvik, east of Nyköping. Studsvik also hosted a reactor named R2-0 nuclear reactor. Both R2 and R2-0 were small research reactors, and both were decommissioned in 2005. Furthermore there was also a third research reactor in Studsvik called FR-0 nuclear reactor which was a zero-power fast reactor with low power output. It was operated 1964–1971 and was then dismantled.

On 1 May 1969, the prototype nuclear cogeneration plant Ågestaverket (R3) suffered an incident in which secondary cooling water flooded through a broken valve and caused a number of electrical problems in the plant, resulting in a 4-day shutdown.

R1, R3, and particularly the never finished R4 project at Marviken were heavy water reactors, motivated by the option to use Swedish uranium without isotope enrichment and by the possibility to use the reactors to produce weapons grade plutonium for Swedish nuclear warheads. The Swedish nuclear weapons program was eventually shut down, however, and Sweden signed the nuclear non-proliferation treaty in 1968.

Six nuclear reactors began commercial service in the 1970s, and another six through 1985. Nine of the reactors were designed by Allmänna Svenska Elektriska Aktiebolaget (ASEA), and three supplied by Westinghouse.

=== Plans for nuclear phase-out ===
After the Three Mile Island accident in 1979, there was a national referendum in Sweden about the future of nuclear power. As a result of this, the Riksdag decided in 1980 that no further nuclear power plants should be built, and that a nuclear power phase-out should be completed by 2010. Some observers have condemned the referendum as flawed because people could only vote "NO to nuclear", although three options were basically a harder or a softer "NO".

After the 1986 Chernobyl accident in USSR, the question of security of nuclear energy was again raised. In July 1992 an incident at Barsebäck 2 showed that the five older boiling water reactors had had potentially reduced capacity in their emergency core cooling systems since they started operation. Mineral wool was dislodged and ended up in the suppression pool where it clogged the suction strainers. It was classified as a grade 2 incident in the IAEA INES scale, due to the degradation of defence-in-depth. All five reactors were ordered down by the Nuclear Inspectorate for remedial action where backwash and additional strainers were installed. Most of the reactors were back in operation by next Spring, but Oskarshamn 1 remained down until January 1996 due to other work being carried out.

During the late 1990s a unique capacity tax on nuclear power (effektskatten) was introduced. It was initially set at 5514 SEK per MWth per month, and only applied to nuclear power plants, thus penalizing them relative to other energy sources. In January 2006 it was almost doubled (at 10,200 SEK per MWth per month). An agreement struck in June 2016 among other things meant the capacity tax would be phased out by 2019. By then the tax constituted about one third of the cost of operating a nuclear reactor.

In 1997 the Riksdag decided to shut down one of the reactors at Barsebäck nuclear power plant by 1 July 1998 and the second before 1 July 2001, although under the condition that their energy production would be compensated. The next conservative government tried to cancel the phase-out, but, after protests, decided instead to extend the time limit to 2010. At Barsebäck, block 1 was shut down on 30 November 1999 and block 2 on 1 June 2005.

In August 2006 three of Sweden's ten nuclear reactors were shut down due to safety concerns following an incident at Forsmark Nuclear Power Plant, in which two out of four emergency power generators failed causing a power shortage. It was classified as a grade 2 incident in the INES scale, due to the degradation of defence-in-depth.

In 2006 the Centre Party of Sweden, an opposition party that until then had supported the phase-out, announced that it was dropping its opposition to nuclear power, at least for the time being, claiming that it is unrealistic to expect the phase-out in the short term. It said it would now support the stance of the other opposition parties in Alliance for Sweden, which were considerably more pro-nuclear than the then Social Democratic government.

=== Phase-out abandoned ===
On 17 June 2010, the Riksdag adopted a decision allowing the replacement of the existing reactors with new nuclear reactors, starting from 1 January 2011.

In June 2016, the coalition government decided to abolish the nuclear power output tax in 2019 and to successively replace the existing reactors with new ones. In October 2022, the new Swedish governing decided to have Ringhals 1 and 2 reactors restarted and the construction of further reactors examined.

=== Nuclear revival ===
In June 2023, the new Kristersson Cabinet established after the country's 2022 election voted to switch the national energy target from 100% renewable electricity by 2045 to 100% fossil fuel-free electricity by 2045, a move seen as supporting and extending the ongoing use of nuclear power in the country. At the time, hydro, nuclear, and wind power already produced 98% of Sweden's electricity, with the government aiming to increase electricity production from carbon-free sources to meet an estimated doubling of national electricity consumption by 2040.

In November 2023, more details about the new nuclear policy, which is to enter into force on 1 January 2024, were revealed. The current 10 reactor cap will be dropped, permitting process will be shortened and new nuclear reactors will be allowed also on new sites and not just existing ones. A target of 2500 MWe of nuclear power by 2035 was announced, as electricity consumption is expected to rise to 300 TWh by 2045. In 2024, a Swedish government study proposed a new financing and risk sharing model providing a sufficient return on investment for the private sector to invest in new nuclear power. The proposal involved three elements: government loans, contract for difference guaranteed electricity pricing financed by consumers, and a mechanism ensuring a minimum return for equity investors.

== List of electricity producing nuclear reactors ==
Plant name	Unit No.	Type	Model	Status	Capacity (MW)	Begin building	Commercial operation	Closed	
Ågesta	1	PHWR	R3	Shut down/in decommissioning	10	1 Dec 1957	1 May 1964	2 Jun 1974	(Note: The full reactor model name is R3/Adam.)
Barsebäck	1	BWR	ASEA-II	Shut down/in decommissioning	600	1 Feb 1971	1 Jul 1975	30 Nov 1999	(Note: The full reactor model name is ASEA-ATOM Gen II.)
Barsebäck	2	BWR	ASEA-II	Shut down/in decommissioning	600	1 Jan 1973	1 Jul 1977	31 May 2005	(Note: The full reactor model name is ASEA-ATOM Gen II.)
Forsmark	1	BWR	ASEA-III, BWR-2500	Operational	986	1 Jun 1973	10 Dec 1980		(Note: The full reactor model name is ASEA-ATOM Gen III, BWR-2500, BWR 69.)
Forsmark	2	BWR	ASEA-III, BWR-2500	Operational	1116	1 Jan 1975	7 Jul 1981		(Note: The full reactor model name is ASEA-ATOM Gen III, BWR-2500, BWR 69.)
Forsmark	3	BWR	ASEA-IV, BWR-3000	Operational	1167	1 Jan 1979	18 Aug 1985		(Note: The full reactor model name is ASEA-ATOM Gen IV, BWR-3000, BWR 75.)
Oskarshamn	1	BWR	ASEA-I	Shut down/in decommissioning	473	1 Aug 1966	6 Feb 1972	19 Jun 2017	(Note: The full reactor model name is ASEA-ATOM Gen I.)
Oskarshamn	2	BWR	ASEA-II	Shut down/in decommissioning	638	1 Sep 1969	1 Jan 1975	22 Dec 2016	(Note: The full reactor model name is ASEA-ATOM Gen II.)
Oskarshamn	3	BWR	ASEA-IV, BWR-3000	Operational	1450	1 May 1980	15 Aug 1985		(Note: The full reactor model name is ASEA-ATOM Gen IV, BWR-3000, BWR 75.)
Marviken	1	BHWR	R4	Unfinished	196	1 Apr 1965		27 May 1970	(Note: The full reactor model name is R4/Eva. Construction date is approximate. Data are from Swedish Radiation Safety Authority.)
Ringhals	1	BWR	ASEA-I	Shut down/in decommissioning	881	1 Feb 1969	1 Jan 1976	31 Dec 2020	(Note: The full reactor model name is ASEA-ATOM Gen I. Closed at midnight on New Year's Eve.)
Ringhals	2	PWR	WH 3-loops	Shut down/in decommissioning	904	1 Oct 1970	1 May 1975	30 Dec 2019	(Note: The full reactor model name is Westinghouse 3-loops.)
Ringhals	3	PWR	WH 3-loops	Operational	1062	1 Sep 1972	9 Sep 1981		(Note: The full reactor model name is Westinghouse 3-loops.)
Ringhals	4	PWR	WH 3-loops	Operational	1104	1 Nov 1973	21 Nov 1983		(Note: The full reactor model name is Westinghouse 3-loops.)

== Decommissioned reactors ==
The decommissioned nuclear reactors of Sweden are:

- R1 reactor, dismantled in 1970
- R2 reactor, decommissioned in 2005
- R2-0 reactor, decommissioned in 2005
- FR-0 reactor, dismantled after 1971
- Ågesta Nuclear Plant R3, decommissioned 1974, demolition planned 2020-2025
- R4 nuclear reactor, cancelled in 1970
- Barsebäck Nuclear Power Plant Reactor 1, decommissioned 1999, demolition planned 2020-2028
- Barsebäck Nuclear Power Plant Reactor 2, decommissioned 2005, demolition planned 2020-2028
- Oskarshamn Nuclear Power Plant Unit 1, decommissioned 2017, demolition planned 2020-2028
- Oskarshamn Nuclear Power Plant Unit 2, decommissioned 2016, demolition planned 2020-2028
- Ringhals Nuclear Power Plant R1, decommissioned 2020
- Ringhals Nuclear Power Plant R2, decommissioned 2019

== Public opinion ==
The nuclear energy phase-out is controversial in Sweden. The energy production of the remaining nuclear power plants has been considerably increased in recent years to compensate for the Barsebäck shut-down.

In May 2005, a poll of residents living around Barsebäck found that 94% wanted it to stay. The subsequent leak of radioactive water from the nuclear waste store in Forsmark did not lead to a major change in public opinion. According to a poll of January 2008, 48% of Swedes were in favour of building new nuclear reactors, 39% were opposed and 13% were undecided. However, the 2011 Fukushima Daiichi nuclear disaster in Japan reversed prior support of nuclear power, with polls showing that 64% of Swedes opposed new reactors while 27% supported them. However, in a poll November 2019 the public opinion has changed with 78% in favor of nuclear power and only 11% against.

Prior public support for nuclear power stood in contrast to the stances of the major political parties in Sweden, but after the polls in late 2019 the debate changed and the parties that want to build new nuclear power in Sweden (SD, M, KD, L ) put forth a demand to the leading government party, the Social Democrats to choose a path forward, otherwise they might break with the standing energy agreement and work to reform the policy towards nuclear power, outside of the influence of the minority government.

== Nuclear waste ==
Sweden has a well-developed nuclear waste management policy. Low-level waste is currently stored at the reactor sites or destroyed at Studsvik. The country has dedicated a ship, M/S Sigyn, to move waste from power plants to repositories. Sweden has also constructed a permanent underground repository, SFR, final repository for short-lived radioactive waste, with a capacity of 63,000 cubic meters for intermediate and low-level waste. A central interim storage facility for spent nuclear fuel, Clab, is located near Oskarshamn. The government has also identified two potential candidates for burial of additional waste (high-level), Oskarshamn and Östhammar.

== Anti-nuclear activists ==
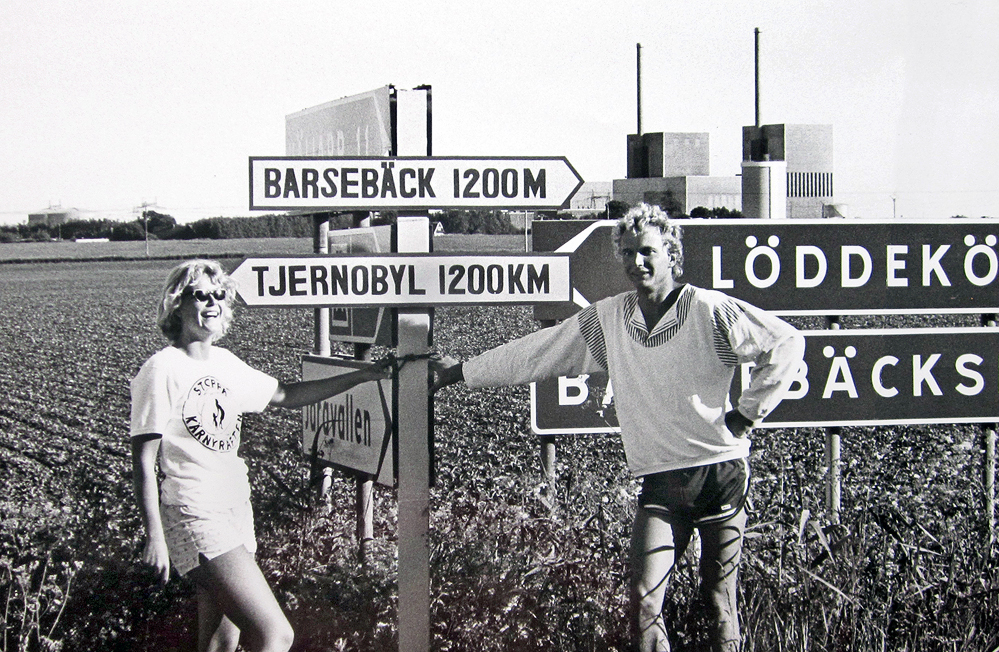
Environmental activists in front of the Barsebäck nuclear power plant. These road signs were put up on roads around the power plant two weeks after the Chernobyl disaster.

In June 2010, Greenpeace anti-nuclear activists invaded Forsmark nuclear power plant to protest the then-plan to remove the government prohibition on building new nuclear power plants. In October 2012, 20 Greenpeace activists scaled the outer perimeter fence of the Ringhals nuclear plant, and there was also an incursion of 50 activists at the Forsmark plant. Greenpeace said that its non-violent actions were protests against the continuing operation of these reactors, which it says are unsafe in European stress tests, and to emphasise that stress tests did nothing to prepare against threats from outside the plant. A report by the Swedish nuclear regulator said that "the current overall level of protection against sabotage is insufficient". Although Swedish nuclear power plants have security guards, the police are responsible for emergency response. The report criticised the level of cooperation between nuclear site staff and police in the case of sabotage or attack.

== Photo gallery ==
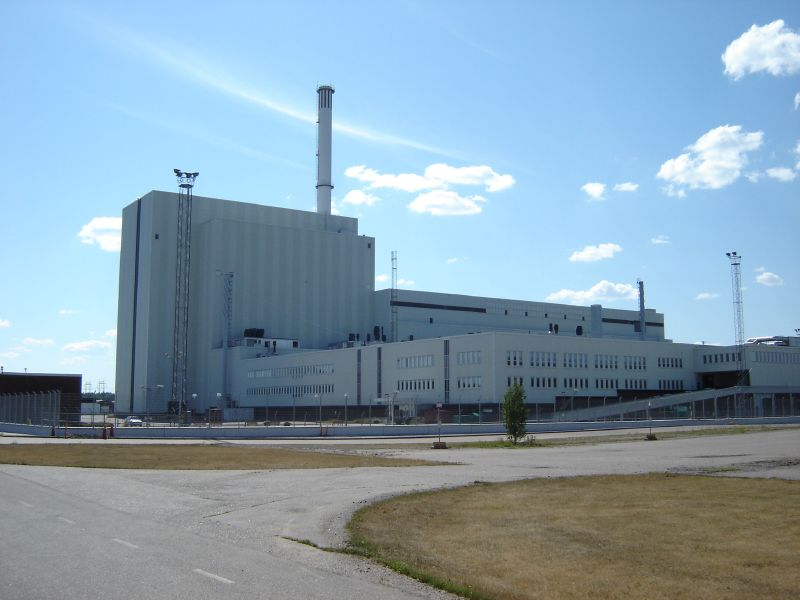
The Forsmark Nuclear Power Plant

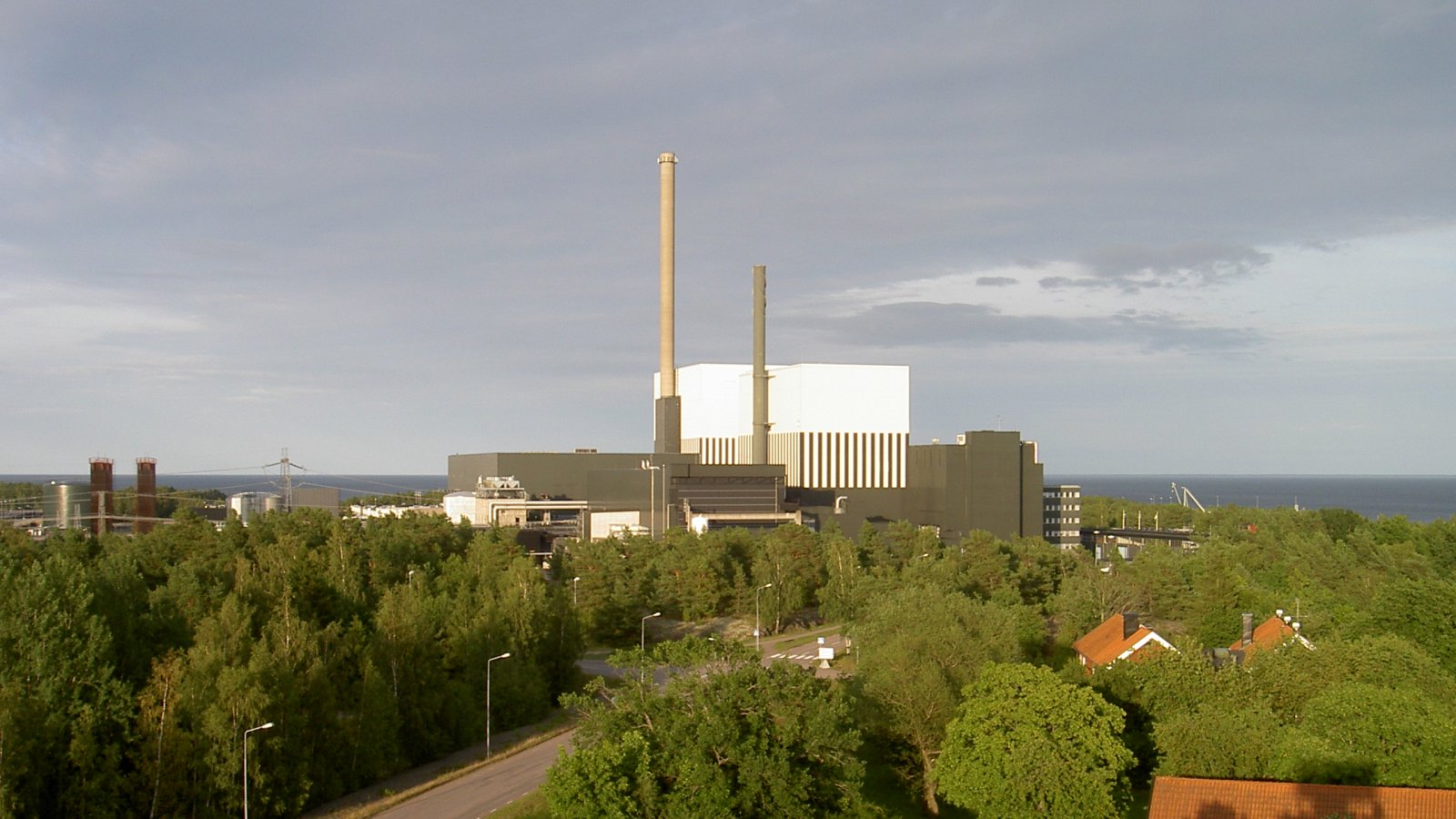
The Oskarshamn Nuclear Power Plant

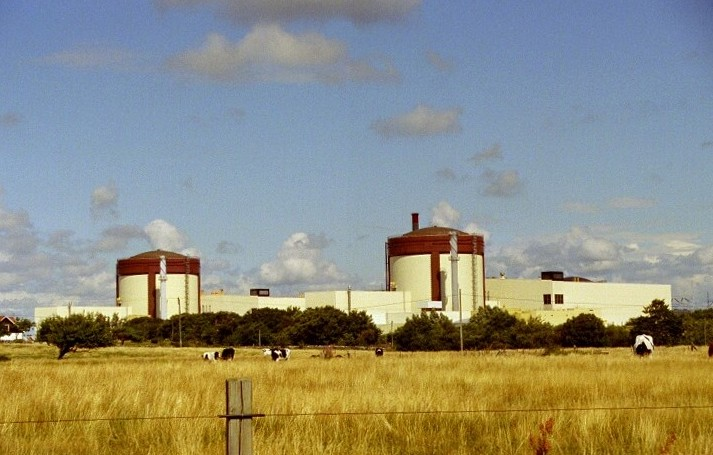
The Ringhals Nuclear Power Plant

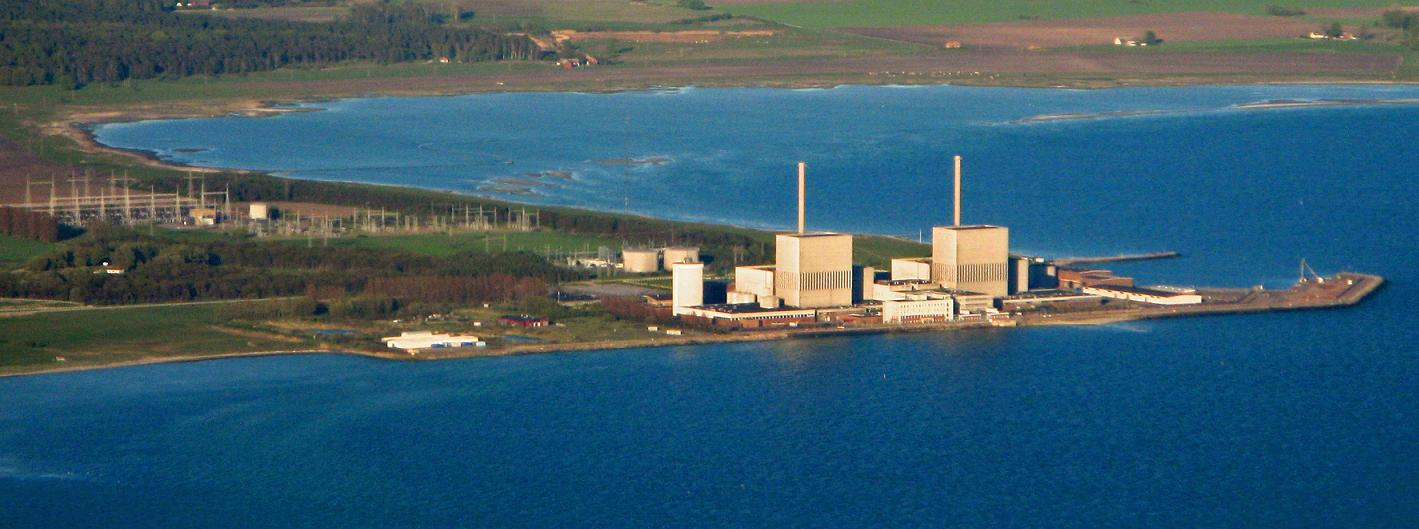
The Barsebäck Nuclear Power Plant, which has been shut down

== See also ==
- Politics of Sweden
- Nuclear energy policy
- Energy policy of the European Union
