= Ågesta Nuclear Plant =

Decommissioned nuclear power plant in Sweden

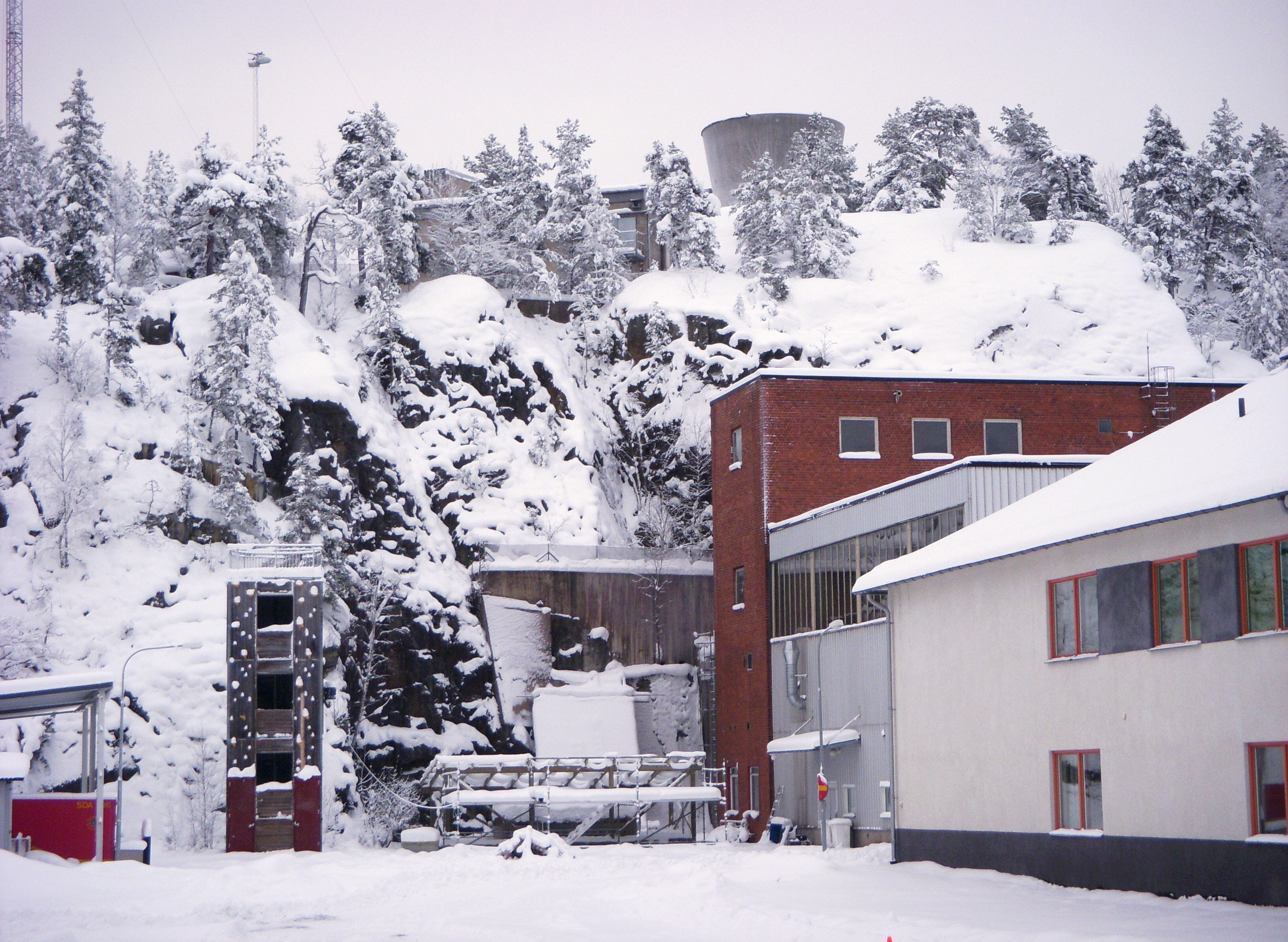
- Country: Sweden
- Location: Ågesta (subdivision)
- Coordinates: 59°12′21.68″N 18°4′58.34″E
- Status: Decommissioned
- Construction began: 1957
- Commission date: 1 May 1964
- Decommission date: 2 June 1974
- Owner: Vattenfall
- Operators: Vattenfall AB, Barsebäck Kraft AB
- Cogeneration?: Yes

Power generation
- Units decommissioned: 1 x 12 MW

External links
- Commons: Related media on Commons

Nuclear power plants in Sweden (view)
Active plants
Closed plants
Unfinished plants

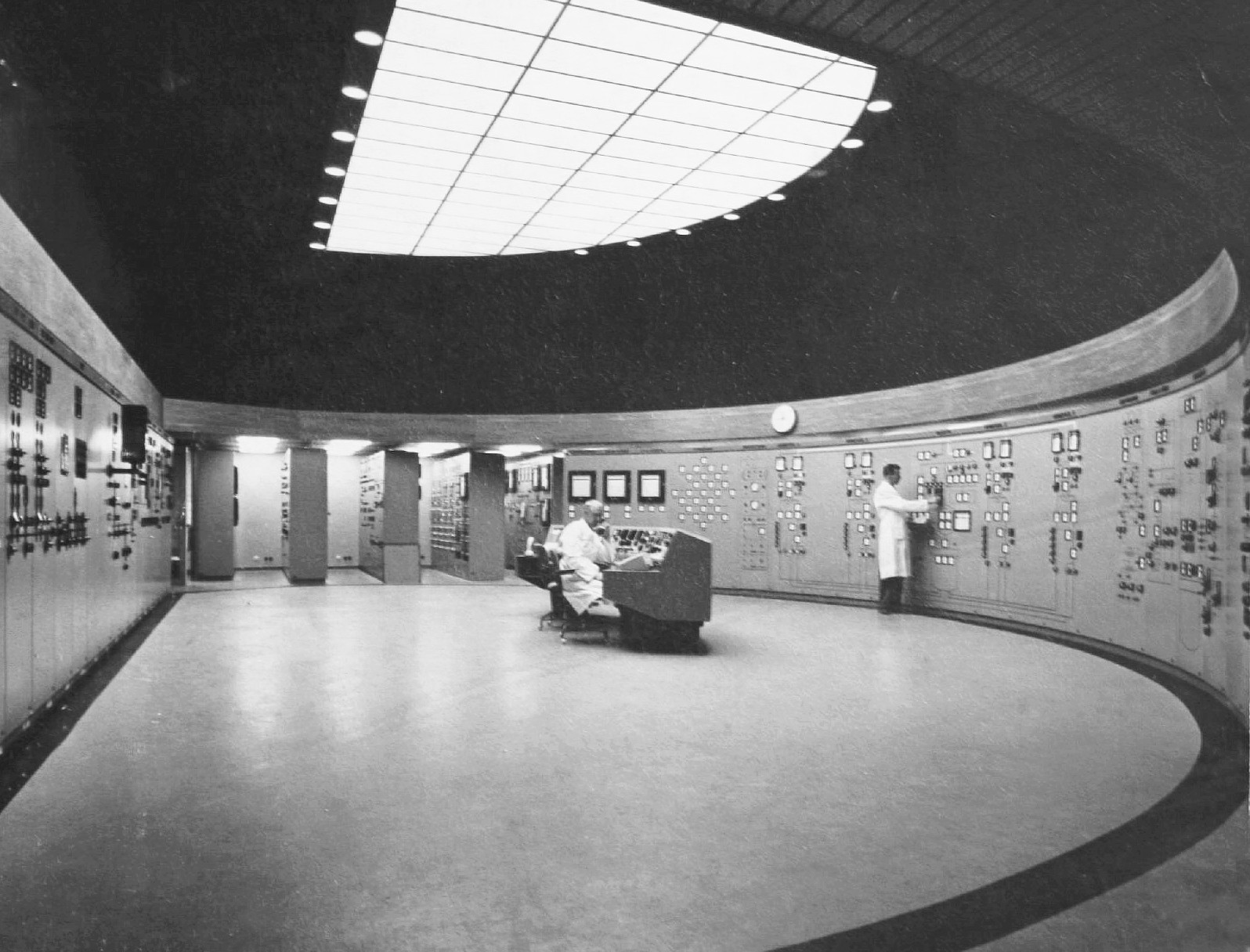
The control room of the Ågesta Nuclear Plant

The Ågesta Nuclear Plant (also Ågestaverket or just Ågesta) was the first Swedish commercial nuclear power plant built by ASEA. Also known as R3 nuclear reactor, it was the third nuclear reactor built in Sweden. Construction started in 1957 and ended in 1962, operations began in 1964 and continued until 1974.

The station was built underground, used heavy water moderation and was fueled with natural uranium. The station primarily provided district heating (initially 60 MW then increased to 80 MW) for the Stockholm suburb Farsta, as well as a small amount of electricity, 12 MW. It is widely assumed that the underground reactors had military purposes, being able to produce plutonium. The cost of construction was estimated at SEK 50 million but the final cost was SEK 230 million.

The companies Stockholms Elverk and Statens Vattenfallsverk were responsible for the building of the Ågesta plant. Before it was finished, another larger reactor, the R4 nuclear reactor was built at Marviken. The R4 reactor was intended for both electricity and plutonium production but it was cancelled in 1970.

The station operated reliably except for problems with fuel rods in 1968 and a flooding incident on 1 May 1969. 15 fuel assemblies failed in 1968, causing the reactor to be shut down for seven months. In 1969 errors in operating procedures caused a valve to fail leaking 400 cubic metres of cooling water. This overloaded the drainage system and caused short-circuits throughout the plant. The water short-circuited the Emergency Core Coolant System resulting in high pressure heavy water leaking out of the core and into the piping of the ECCS. The water caused one of the main busbars for one of the generators to short, shutting down a turbine. The short-circuits preventing flooding from being indicated on the control board. The Swedish Nuclear Power Inspectorate did not publicly release information about this failure until 1993.

The Ågesta reactor, with 10 MW, was much smaller than the later Swedish reactor types. The reactor was part of a project called "the Swedish line" (Svenska Linjen), an international initiative to use natural uranium (not enriched) for fuel in commercial power plants. The shutdown of the plant was mostly a result of low oil prices and poor economics.

The Swedish Radiation Safety Authority approved demolition of the station in December 2019, with work expected to begin in 2020 and to be completed by 2025.

== See also ==
- Nuclear power in Sweden
- Ågestasjön
