= R1 (nuclear reactor) =

Graphite Nuclear Reactor made in Sweden

Coordinates: 59°21′00″N 18°04′05″E

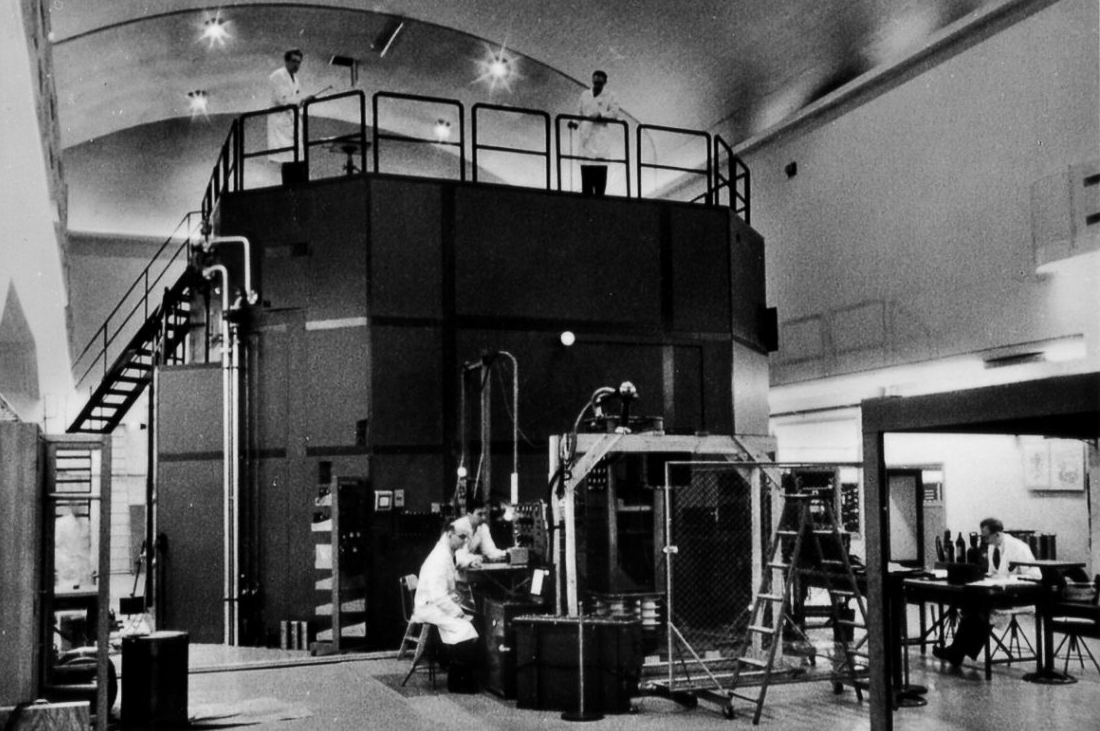
The R1 nuclear reactor in the 1960s.

R1 was the first nuclear reactor of Sweden. It was a research reactor located at the KTH Royal Institute of Technology campus at Valhallavägen in central Stockholm, in the rock beneath the current-day Q buildings. The reactor was active from July 13, 1954, to June 6, 1970. The reactor was dismantled, and there is nothing left of it today; the reactor hall however still exists.

== History ==
As World War II came to a close, the Swedish government in 1950 formed a group of physicists and engineers to study and learn more about the basics – reactor physics, radiation, materials, etc. – but also to produce medical isotopes. The capacity of the reactor was originally 300 kW but was later increased to 1 MW. R1 was housed in a large hall reminiscent of a cathedral giving it the nickname the “Cathedral of Science and Technology”. Rolf Sievert served as the head of the radiation department at KTH Royal Institute of Technology and gave the approval to run the reactor. R1 was soon overtaken by Studsvik for nuclear research and on June 6, 1970 R1 was dismantled.

== Today ==
After being dismantled, the hall that R1 sat was deemed safe and was used for events like art exhibitions, concerts and music videos due to its interesting aesthetic and acoustics. It is open to the public during limited times for tours.

In 2016, the reactor hall was used to film the music video for Alan Walker's song Faded (Restrung). The video was released on 11 February 2016.

In 2015, a small Wurlitzer Theatre pipe organ was installed in the reactor hall, and has over 7 sets of pipes (ranks), and two keyboards, and additional instruments such as drums, a xylophone, and various sound effects such as a siren.

The organ was first installed in the Bio Skandia theatre in Stockholm, then relocated in the 1950s to the Blue Hall in the Stockholm City Hall, to serve as a temporary instrument while the hall's main organ was being restored. When the main organ was restored, the Wurlitzer was simply dismantled and stored for almost half a century.

In 2005, the Wurlitzer was unearthed, with the console stored at the KTH, and the pipes being stored at the City Hall. Restoration work started in 2006 with the formation of the Skandia Organ Association, In 2011, work began on constructing the organ chambers, and by August 2015 the last part, a bass drum arrived. In October 2015, the Wurlitzer was reactivated with a rededication concert, and is now regularly used for concerts and research.

== Images ==
KTH R1 in 2021
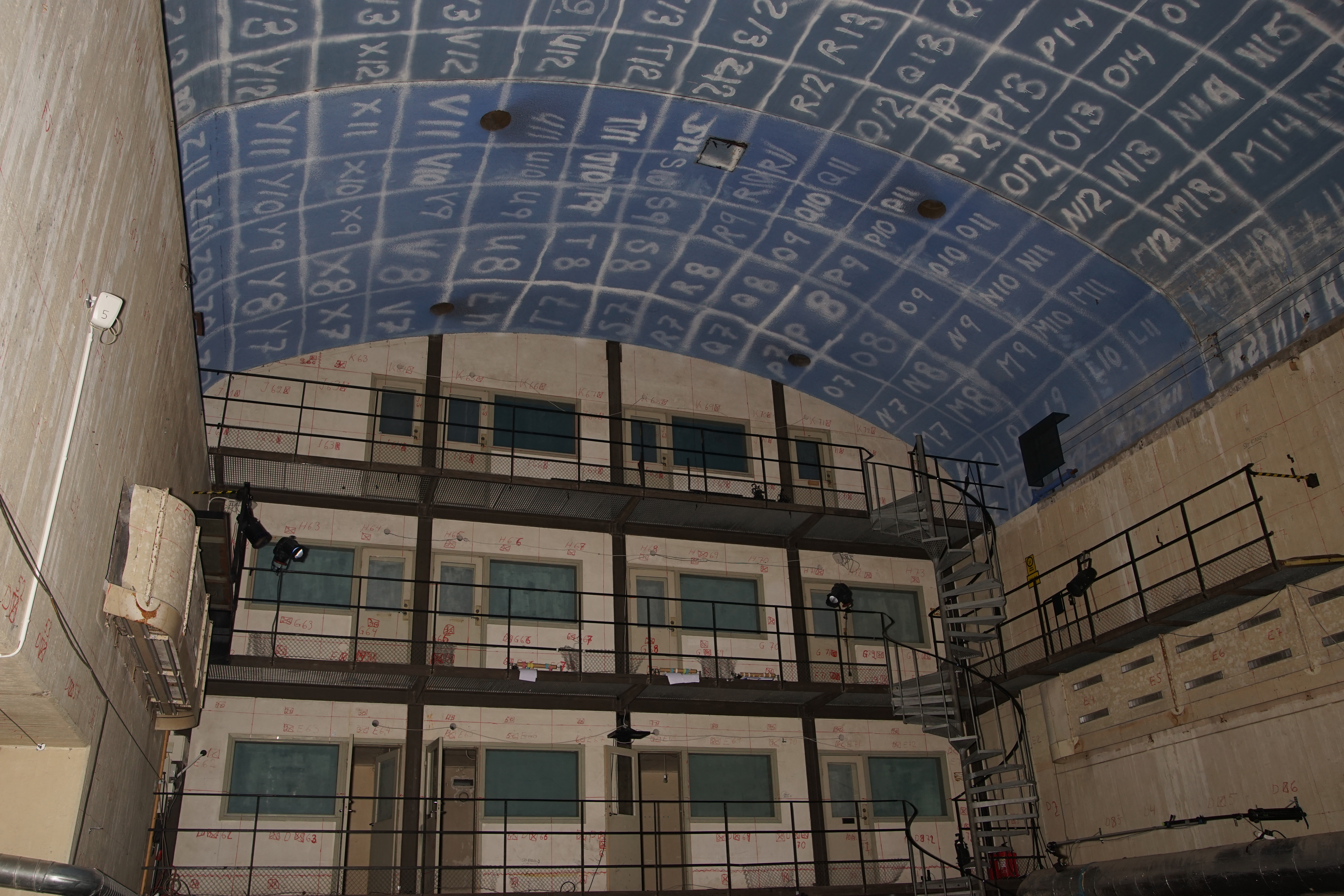

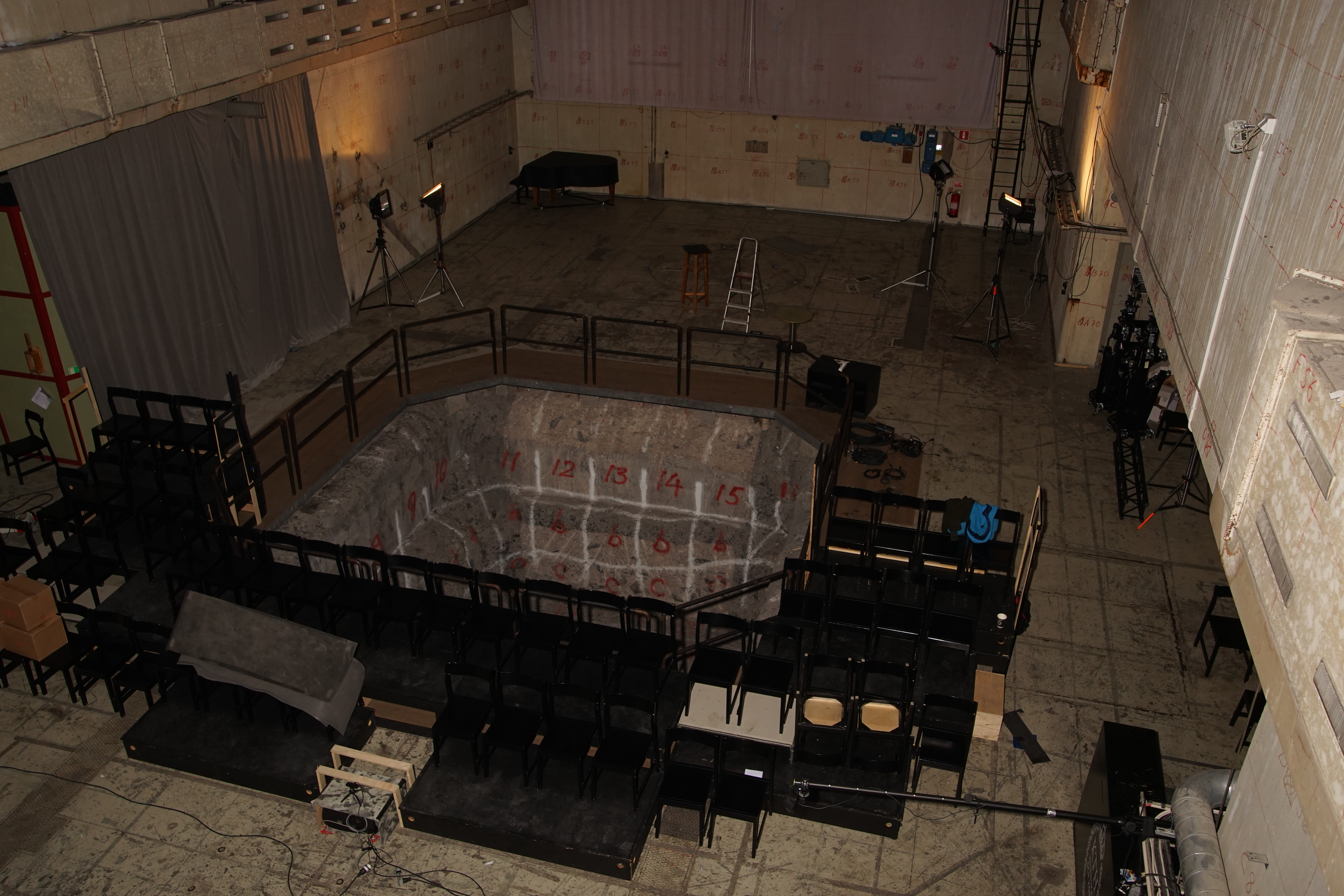

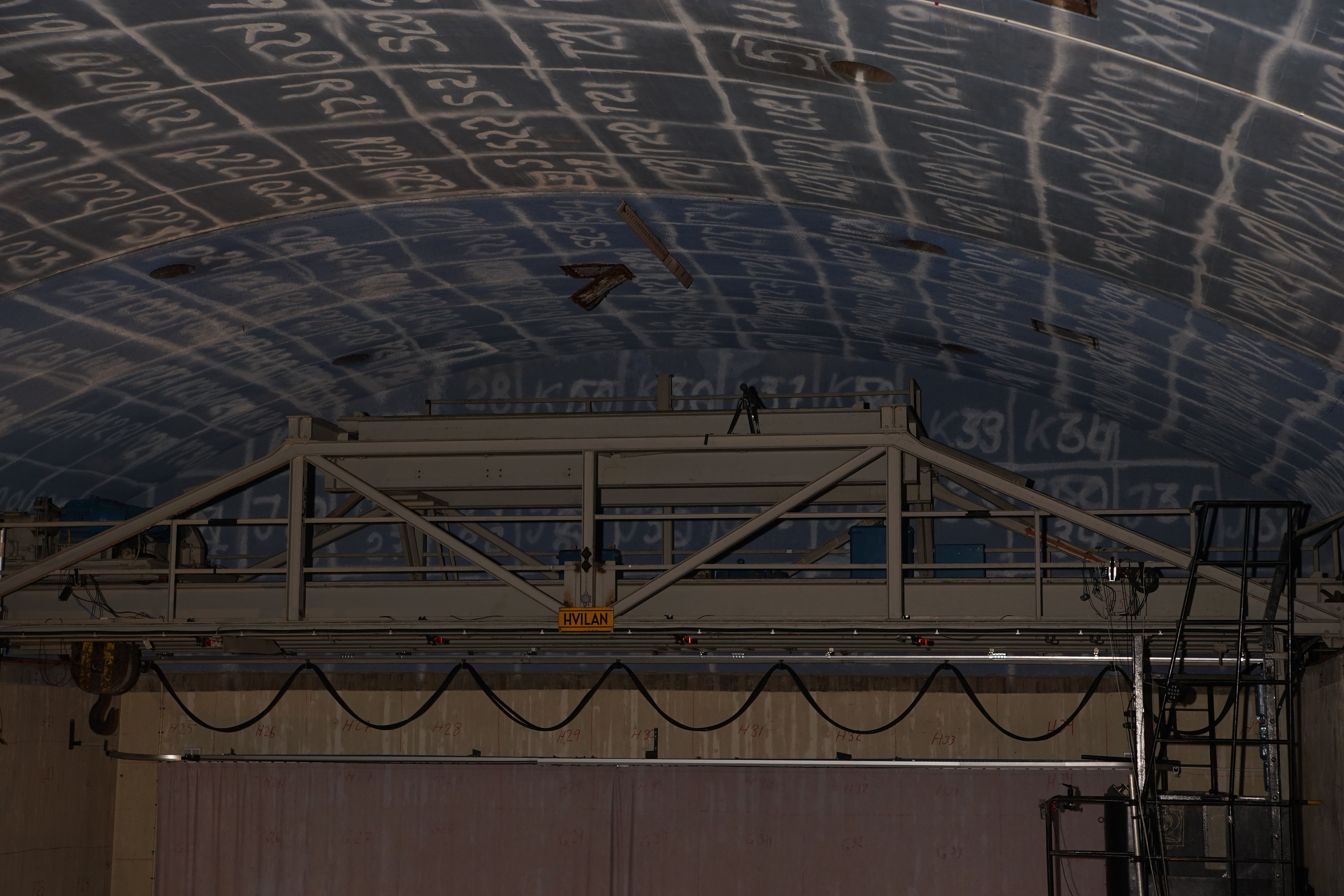

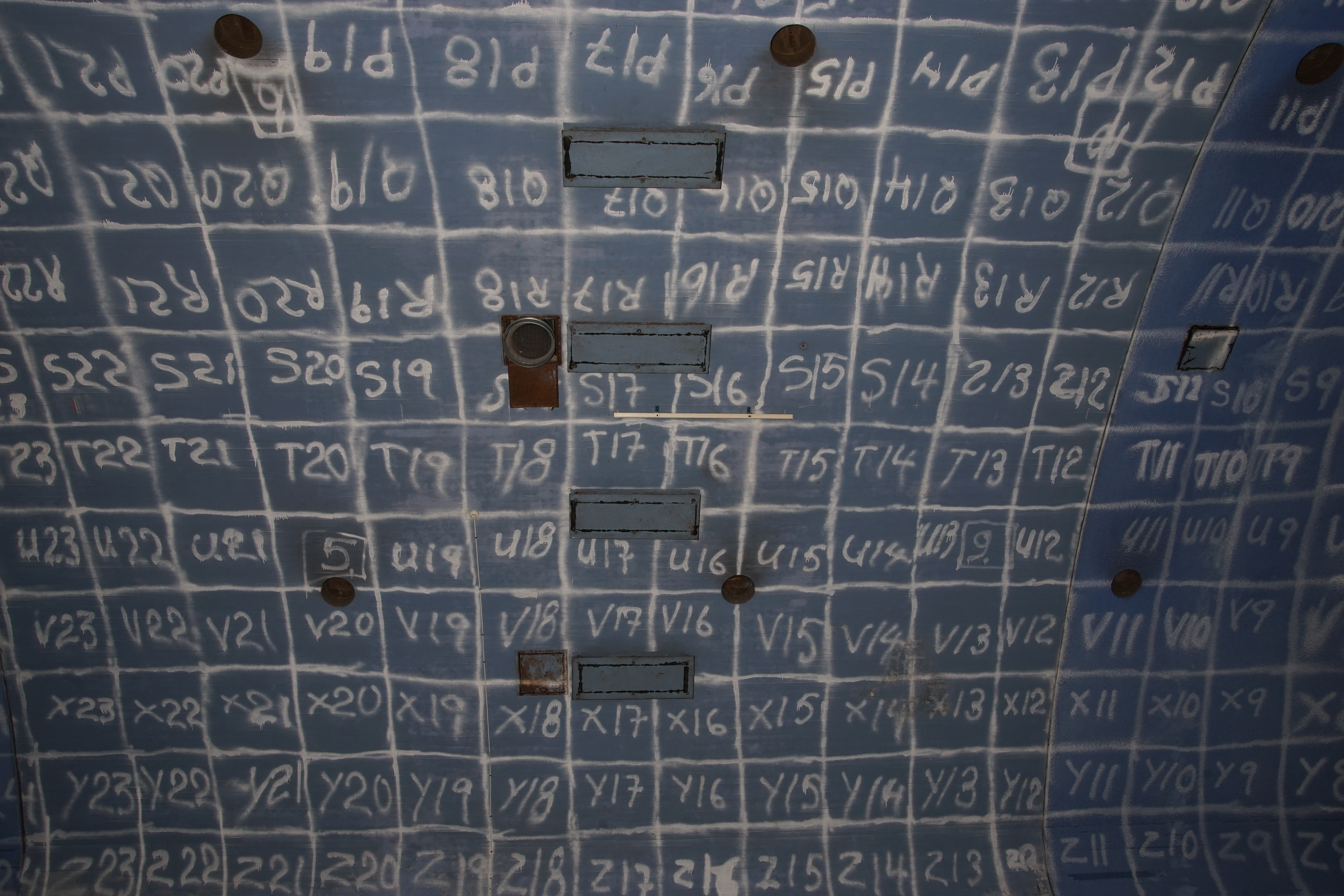
