= 1980 Swedish nuclear power referendum =

23 March 1980
- Sweden now has six nuclear power reactors in operation. A further four reactors have been completed and two are under construction. The Riksdag has decided that a referendum on the role of nuclear power in the future energy supply shall be held on March 23, 1980. The vote applies to three different proposals.

Results
Choice	Votes	%
Option 1	904,968	19.59%
Option 2	1,869,344	40.46%
Option 3	1,845,911	39.95%
Valid votes	4,620,223	99.93%
Invalid or blank votes	3,153	0.07%
Total votes	4,623,376	100.00%
Registered voters/turnout	6,321,165	73.14%
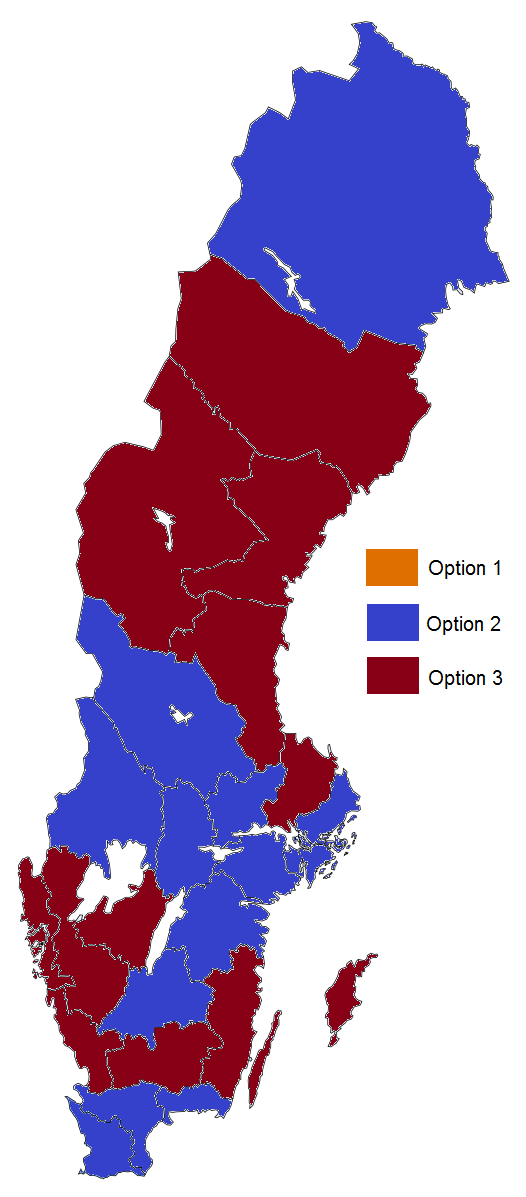
Results by county
Option 1 Option 3	Option 2

A non-binding referendum on nuclear power was held in Sweden on 23 March 1980. Three proposals were put to voters. The second option, the gradual phasing out of nuclear power, won a narrow plurality of the vote, receiving 39.1% of the ballots cast to 38.7% for option 3. Option 1 was the least popular, receiving only 18.9% of the votes.

The actual long term result of the nuclear power politics in Sweden after the referendum has been most similar to option 1 which did not change ownership of nuclear power plants. Some were fully private and other owned by the government, and this did not change much. High profits in hydroelectric generation were not excessively taxed. Although some of the nuclear power plants were decommissioned, the Swedish government decided to reverse the policy.

== Details of the options ==
=== Option 1 ===
The ballot for Option 1 (Linje 1) read:

Nuclear power shall be phased out, while taking consideration of the need for electric power for the maintenance of employment and welfare. In order to, among other things, lessen the dependency on oil, and while waiting for the availability of renewable energy sources, at most 12 of the reactors shall be used, be they existing or under construction. No further expansion is to take place. The order in which the reactors will be taken out of production will be determined by security concerns.

There was no text on the reverse side of the ballot.

=== Option 2 ===
The front side of the ballot for Option 2 (Linje 2) had almost identical wording to that of Option 1. However, on the reverse side, the following text was added:

Energy conservation shall be pursued vigorously and stimulated further. The weakest groups in society shall be protected. Measures shall be taken to control consumption of electricity, e.g. prohibiting direct electric heating in the construction of new permanent housing.

Research and development of renewable energy sources shall be pursued under the leadership of the community [government].

Environmental and safety improving measures are to be carried out. A special safety study is to be made at each reactor. To allow insight by the citizens a special security committee with local ties is appointed at each nuclear power plant.

Production of electricity from oil and coal is to be avoided.

The community [government] shall have the main responsibility for production and distribution of electric power. Nuclear power plants and other future installations for the production of significant electric power shall be owned by the state and by the municipalities. Excessive profits from hydroelectric power generation are reduced by taxation.

The last point was controversial and the most important reason why the Moderate Party would not consider supporting Option 2.

=== Option 3 ===
The front side of the ballot for Option 3 (Linje 3) read:

NO to continued expansion of nuclear power.

Phasing out of the currently operating six reactors with at most ten years. A conservation plan for reduced dependency on oil is to be carried through on the basis of:

- continued and intensified energy conservation.
- greatly increased development of renewable energy sources.

The operating reactors are subjected to heightened safety requirements. Non-fueled reactors will never be put into production.

Uranium mining is to be prohibited in our country.

The reverse side of the ballot read:

If ongoing or future safety analyses demand it, immediate shutdown is to take place.

The work against nuclear proliferation and nuclear weapons shall be intensified. No fuel enrichment is permitted and the export of reactors and reactor technology is to cease.

Employment will increase through alternative energy production, more effective conservation of energy and refinement of raw materials.

== Results ==
Choice	Votes	%
Option 1	904,968	18.9
Option 2	1,869,344	39.1
Option 3	1,846,911	38.7
Blank votes	157,103	3.3
Invalid votes	3,153	–
Total	4,781,479	100
Registered voters/turnout	6,321,165	75.6
Source: Nohlen & Stöver

=== By county ===
County	Option 1		Option 2		Option 3		Blank vote		Total
County	Votes	%	Votes	%	Votes	%	Votes	%	Total
Stockholm County	230,045	25.41	295,837	32.68	350,942	38.76	28,503	3.15	905,327
Uppsala County	25,219	18.0	52,642	37.6	58,051	41.4	4,273	3.0	140,185
Södermanland County	23,946	16.56	67,192	46.46	48,110	33.27	5,367	3.71	144,615
Östergötland County	42,343	18.93	95,022	42.49	77,278	34.56	9,011	4.03	223,654
Jönköping County	29,717	17.06	67,137	38.56	71,314	40.95	5,984	3.44	174,152
Kronoberg County	16,909	17.54	35,669	37.01	40,702	42.23	3,098	3.21	96,378
Kalmar County	23,468	17.30	54,507	40.19	53,568	39.50	4,072	3.00	135,615
Gotland County	4,161	13.67	10,474	34.41	14,843	48.76	964	3.17	30,442
Blekinge County	15,116	18.12	41,359	49.59	24,141	28.94	2,788	3.34	83,404
Kristianstad County	35,937	23.74	62,629	41.38	47,490	31.37	5,312	3.51	151,368
Malmöhus County	124,584	28.36	190,651	43.40	109,310	24.88	14,745	3.36	439,290
Halland County	24,695	18.70	45,813	34.69	56,498	42.78	5,059	3.83	132,065
Gothenburg and Bohus County	80,584	19.30	145,791	34.92	177,136	42.42	14,034	3.36	417,545
Älvsborg County	39,797	16.45	91,748	37.92	101,869	42.11	8,508	3.52	241,922
Skaraborg County	24,557	16.13	52,248	34.32	70,079	46.03	5,363	3.52	152,247
Värmland County	25,224	15.02	67,239	41.68	63,929	39.63	4,924	3.05	161,316
Örebro County	21,975	13.79	69,127	43.37	63,162	39.62	5,136	3.22	159,400
Västmanland County	29,375	20.02	64,666	44.08	46,922	31.98	5,738	3.91	146,701
Kopparberg County	19,249	11.91	65,725	40.67	71,112	44.00	5,531	3.42	161,617
Gävleborg County	17,145	10.32	69,911	42.08	74,080	44.59	5,000	3.01	166,146
Västernorrland County	15,831	10.09	67,923	43.28	68,661	43.75	4,519	2.88	156,934
Jämtland County	7,250	9.58	31,259	41.30	35,120	46.40	2,058	2.72	75,687
Västerbotten County	13,734	9.81	56,827	40.58	65,938	47.09	3,527	2.52	140,026
Norrbotten County	14,107	9.91	67,948	47.75	56,656	39.81	3,589	2.52	142,300
Total	904,968	18.94	1,869,344	39.12	1,846,911	38.65	157,103	3.29	4,778,326

== See also ==
- Nuclear power in Sweden
