= Nuclear Power? No Thanks =

Anti-nuclear power logo

English version of the logo

The "Nuclear Power? No Thanks" logo (Danish: Atomkraft? Nej tak), also known as the Smiling Sun, is an international symbol of the anti-nuclear movement. The logo has been present worldwide since the late 1970s and the 1980s. BBC News reported in 2005 that few symbols had become "as instantly recognizable across the world", and even the nuclear power industry had recognized the logo's "power and success". Over 20 million Smiling Sun badges have been produced in over 60 languages, such as Danish, Korean, Swedish, English, Arabic, Hebrew, Norwegian, and Russian.

In recent years the logo has been playing a prominent role once again to raise awareness and funding for anti-nuclear groups, especially in Germany, Austria and Switzerland where opposition is growing to plans for extending the operation of old nuclear reactors and constructing new ones.

== Design history ==
The original Danish-language version as designed in 1975

The Smiling Sun logo was designed in 1975 by, then 21-year-old Danish activist and designer Anne Lund, who was part of the Danish Organisationen til Oplysning om Atomkraft (OOA; English: Organization for Information on Nuclear Power). At the time of creating the logo she had no prior design experience. The logo was trademarked in 1977. By posing the question: "Nuclear Power?" and providing a concise answer, "No Thanks", the logo was intended to express polite dissent and—by questioning nuclear power—to stimulate dialogue. The house where Lund designed the original symbol can still be seen in Klostergade 6-8, Aarhus, Denmark. After the Fukushima disaster in 2011, a new version was released for renewable energy, with the statement "Renewable Energy Yes Please!" (Danish: Vedvarende Energi Ja Tak!) on a green background with a yellow sun. The original logo has been translated into over 60 different languages.

== Mural in Aarhus, Denmark ==
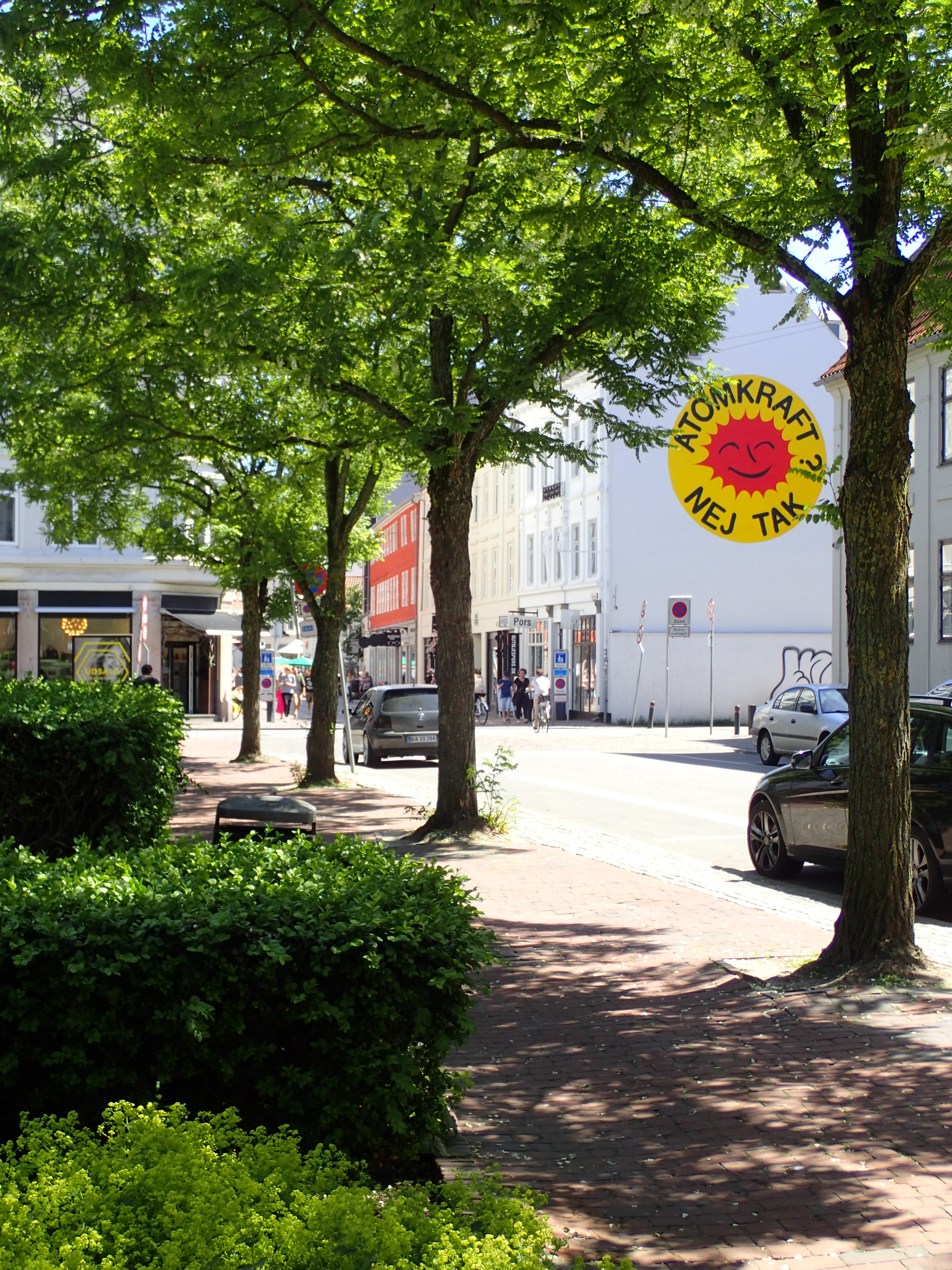
The mural at Vestergade 7 in Aarhus.

In 1983, a mural of the Smiling Sun was painted near the crossing of Vestergade and Emil Vetts Passage in Aarhus, near the location where it was originally designed by Lund. However, in 2008, it was almost destroyed because of real estate developments in the area, but protests by its admirers succeeded in keeping it intact. More recently, it was restored.

== Trademark ==
The Smiling Sun logo is an internationally registered trademark. The purpose of the trademark is to protect the logo against alteration and prevent use by commercial and partisan political interests. Anti-nuclear groups may apply for user rights to the OOA Fund in Denmark. The Italian political parties Federation of Green Lists, Federation of the Greens and Green Europe have licensed use of the symbol for their party electoral materials and logos. The Green Party Taiwan and the Maltese Democratic Alternative used the Smiling Sun symbol in the past too. It is also used by the Alternative Ecologists, United Left/The Greens–Assembly for Andalusia and Initiative for Catalonia Greens. A variation is used by Ökologische Linke.

== Nuclear Power? Yes Please ==
A network of pro-nuclear physicists, software developers, and environmental activists drew inspiration from the original anti-nuclear logo, but viewed nuclear power as part of a sustainable and environmentally-friendly energy option into the 21st century, and devised a similar image—with a pro-nuclear connotation—as part of an ongoing effort that originated in 2008.

Some commentators in support of the "Nuclear Power? Yes Please" movement have made arguments that nuclear power should be regulated and safely conducted, but not outright banned, with George Monbiot arguing in 2016 that "the overwhelming priority for those who make decisions about energy must be to avert climate breakdown. They need to keep the lights on, but not by sacrificing the future welfare of humanity and Earth’s living systems. It is better to light a candle than to curse the darkness. It is also better to curse the darkness than to burn your house down."

Additional pro-nuclear environmentalist commentators have supported the "Nuclear Power? Yes Please" messaging as "part of a comprehensive post-carbon energy" system.

== Gallery ==
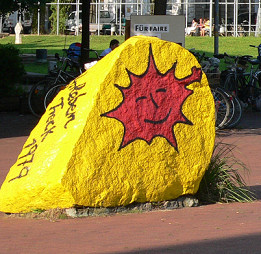

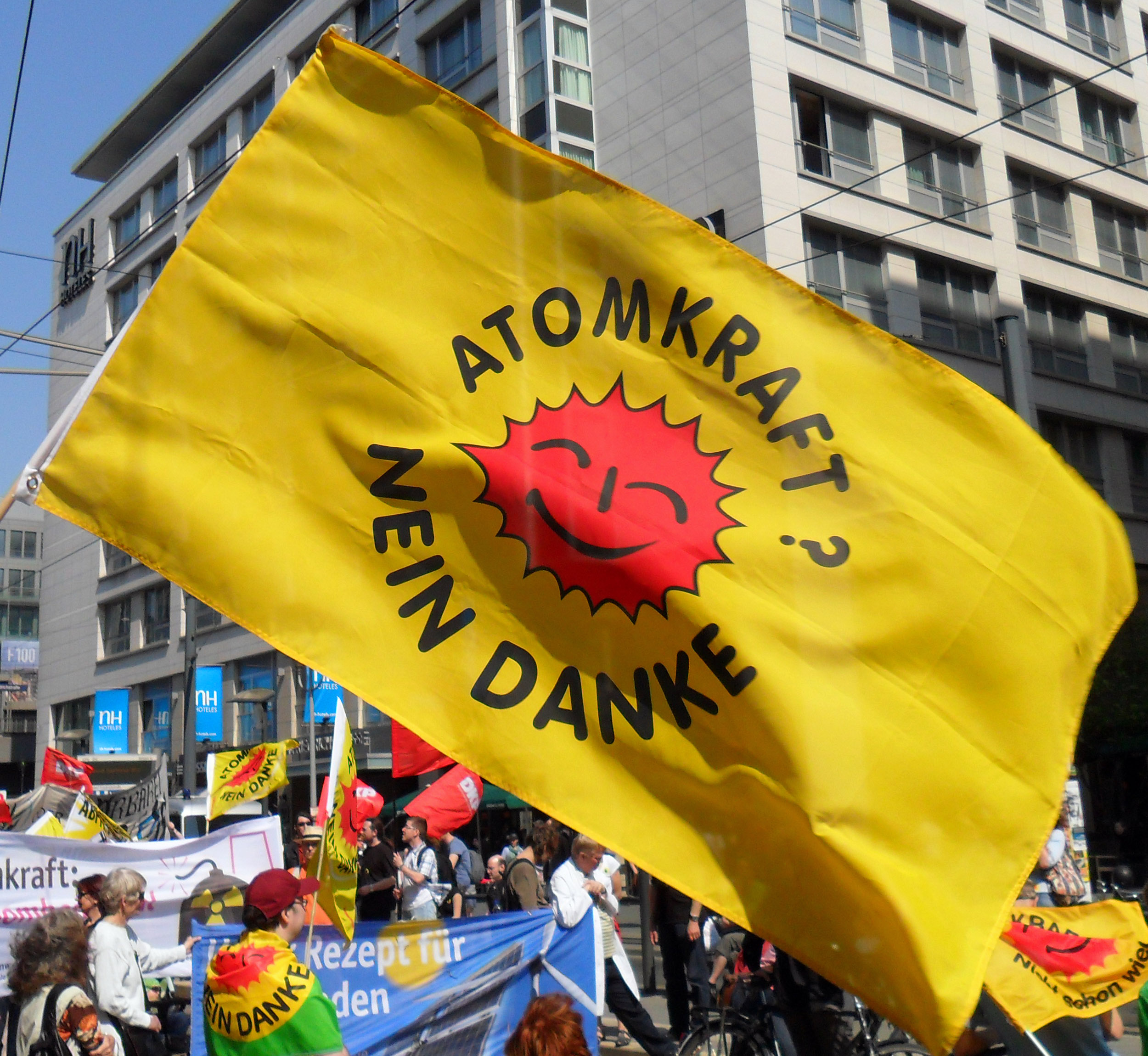

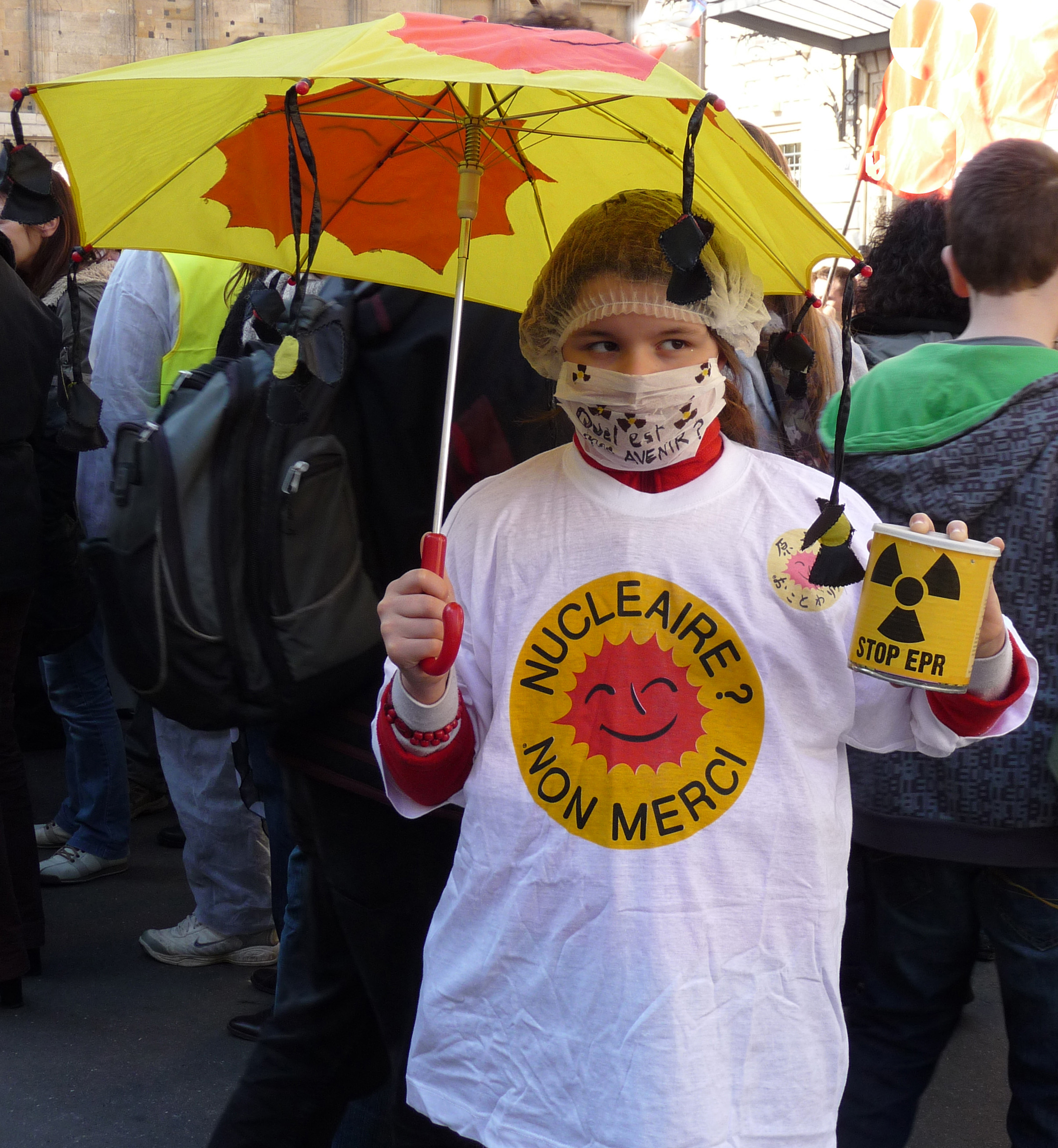

== See also ==
- Nuclear power proposed as renewable energy
- Renewable energy debate
