= Barsebäck Nuclear Power Plant =

Decommissioned nuclear power plant in Sweden

Barsebäck nuclear power plant
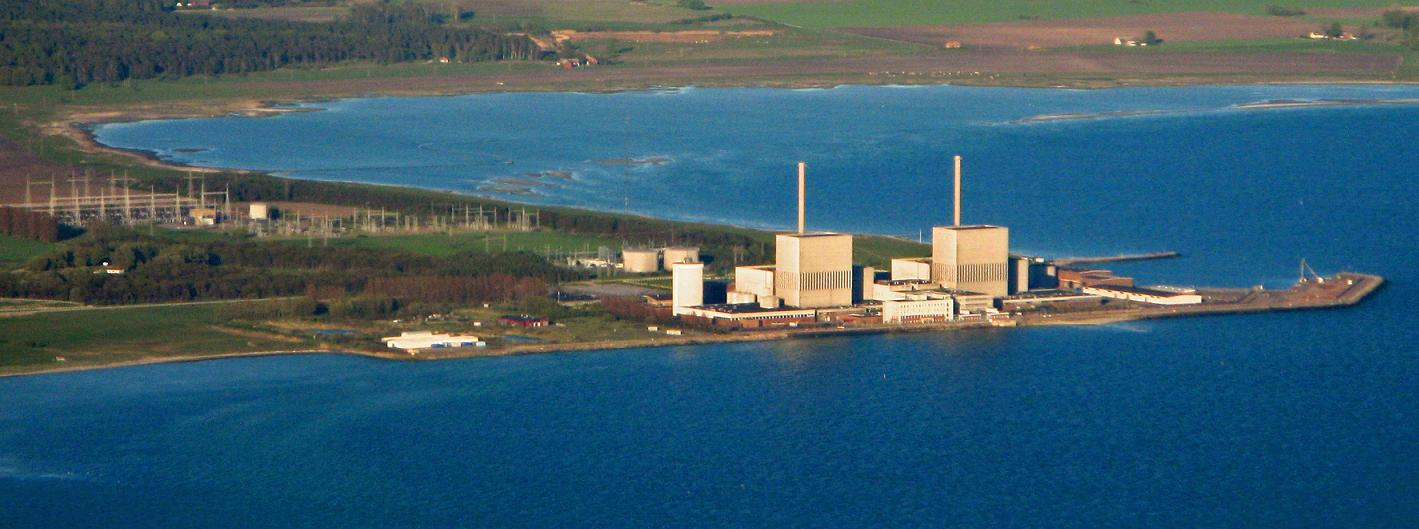
- Country: Sweden
- Coordinates: 55°44′40″N 12°55′15″E
- Status: Decommissioned
- Construction began: 1969
- Commission date: 15 May 1975
- Decommission date: Reactor 1: 30 November 1999; Reactor 2: 31 May 2005
- Owner: Barsebäck Kraft
- Operator: Barsebäck Kraft AB

Nuclear power station
- Reactor type: BWR

Power generation
- Units decommissioned: 2 x 615 MWe
- Capacity factor: 74.8%
- Annual net output: 3572 GWh

External links
- Website: https://www.uniper.energy/barseback/
- Commons: Related media on Commons

Barsebäck (Swedish pronunciation: [ˈbâʂːɛˌbɛk]) is a boiling water nuclear power plant currently undergoing the process of nuclear decommissioning. The plant is situated in Barsebäck, Kävlinge Municipality, Skåne, Sweden.

Located 20 kilometers from the Danish capital, Copenhagen, the Danish government pressed for its closure during the entirety of its operating lifetime. As a result of a now former Swedish nuclear power phase-out, its two reactors have been closed down. The first reactor, Barsebäck 1, was closed on 30 November 1999, and the second, Barsebäck 2, ceased operations on 31 May 2005. At the time of closure, each reactor had a net capacity of 600 megawatts. Units 1 and 2 supplied 93.8 TWh and 108.5 TWh to the electrical grid respectively, with a combined average capacity factor of 74.8%.

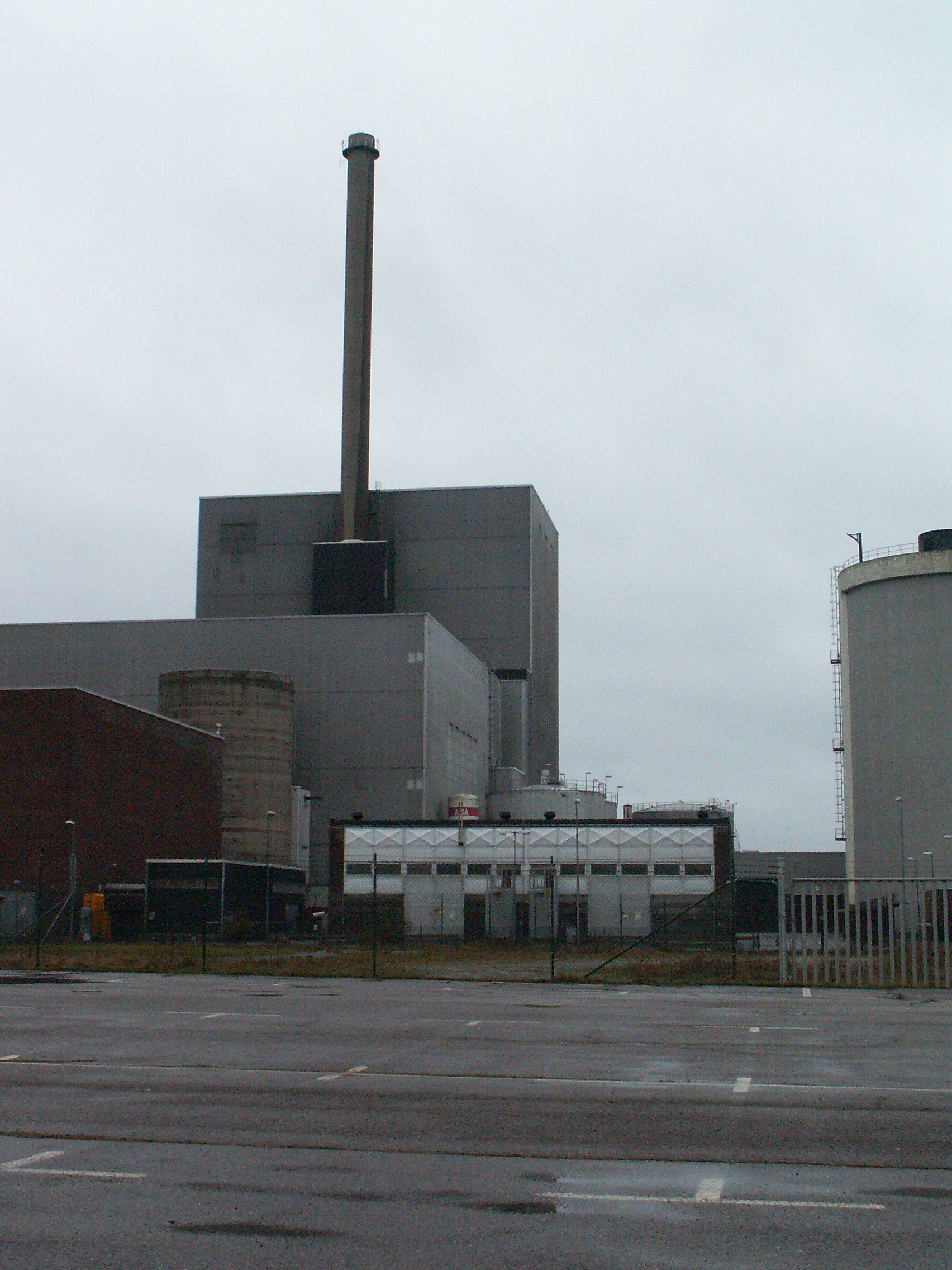
Barsebäck

Land for the plant was bought in 1965 by the energy company Sydkraft, and the first of the two BWR reactors was ordered from Asea-Atom in 1969. Unit one first attained criticality on 18 January 1975 and commercial operation began on May 15. The second reactor attained criticality on 21 March 1977 and commercial operation began on 1 July. Following a decision in the Riksdag in 1997, the Government of Sweden decided that the first reactor was to close on the 1 July 1998, and the second one on the 1 July 2001. Due to the operator's appeal against the decision and lack of emission-free replacement, the closure was postponed.

The demolition of the facility will await the construction of a storage facility, scheduled to be ready in the 2020s. In December 2018 a strategy was outlined for the "radiological demolition" to be carried out between 2020 and 2028. This will allow the land to be used for other nuclear power related purposes.

The plant is operated by Barsebäck Kraft AB, a subsidiary of Sydkraft Nuclear Power AB, owned by Uniper.
