= R4 nuclear reactor =

Nuclear reactor in Sweden

Coordinates: 58°33′11″N 16°49′58″E

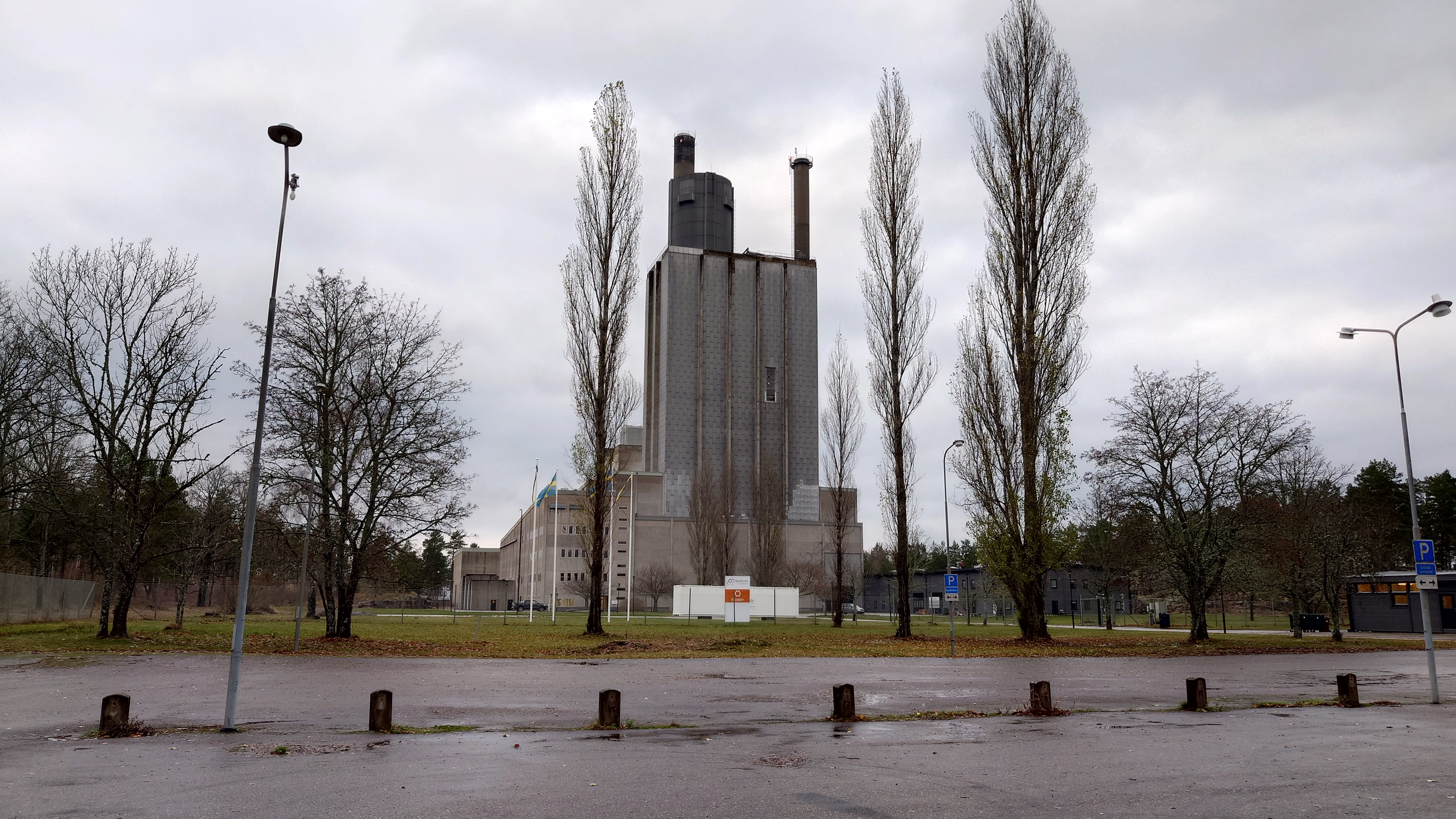
The reactor in 2022.

R4 nuclear reactor was a nuclear reactor built at Marviken, Vikbolandet and the fourth nuclear reactor built in Sweden. It was heavy water moderated and intended for the dual role of 130 MWe of power generation as well as plutonium production. It had a central role in the Swedish nuclear weapon programme. During the mid-1960s, the social democratic government officially abandoned the project of designing Swedish nuclear weapons and the Marviken plant became derelict. It was never loaded with fuel, and the project was cancelled in 1970.

== Experimental site ==
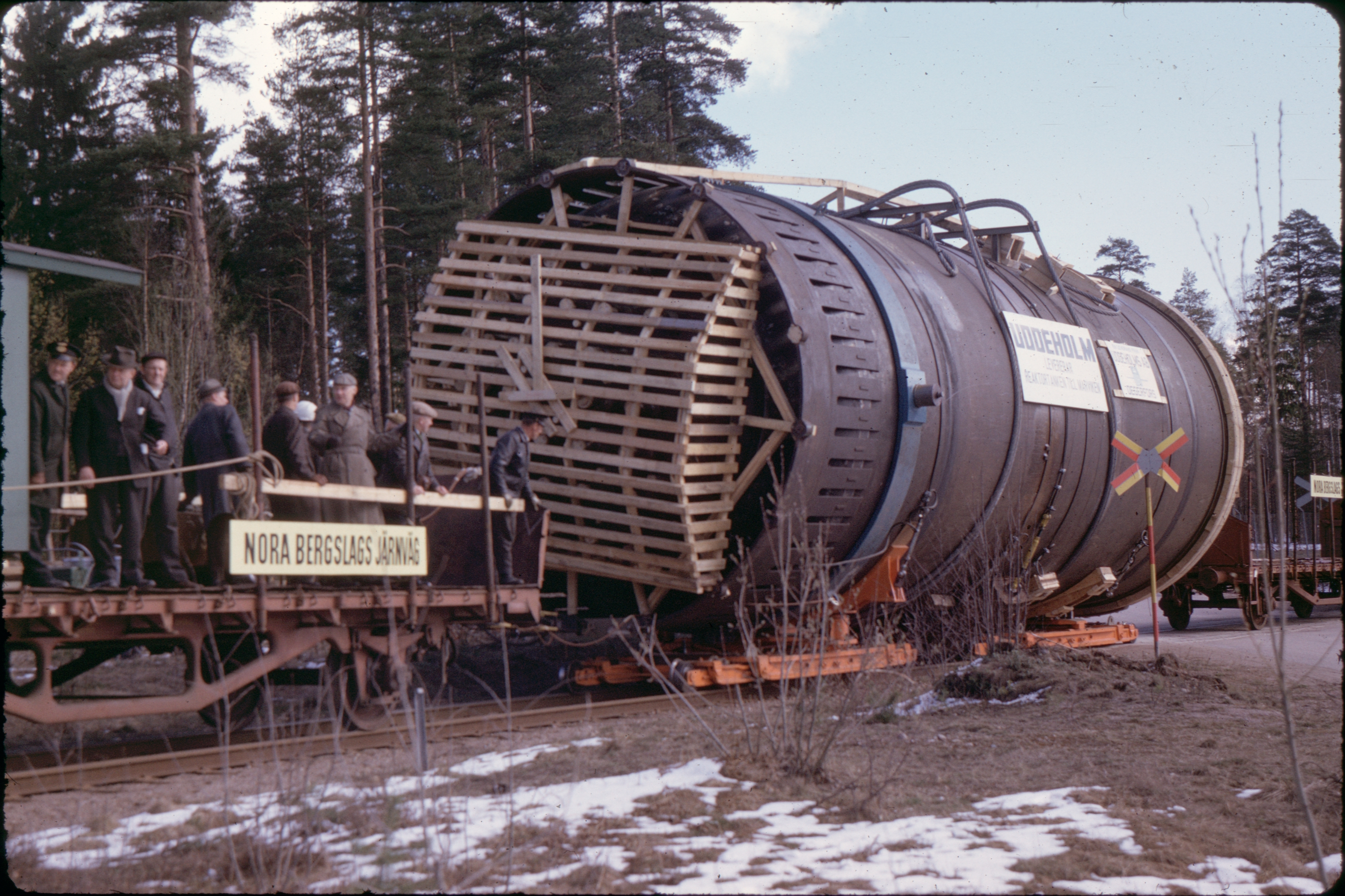
The reactor tank during transportion to the reactor in 1967.

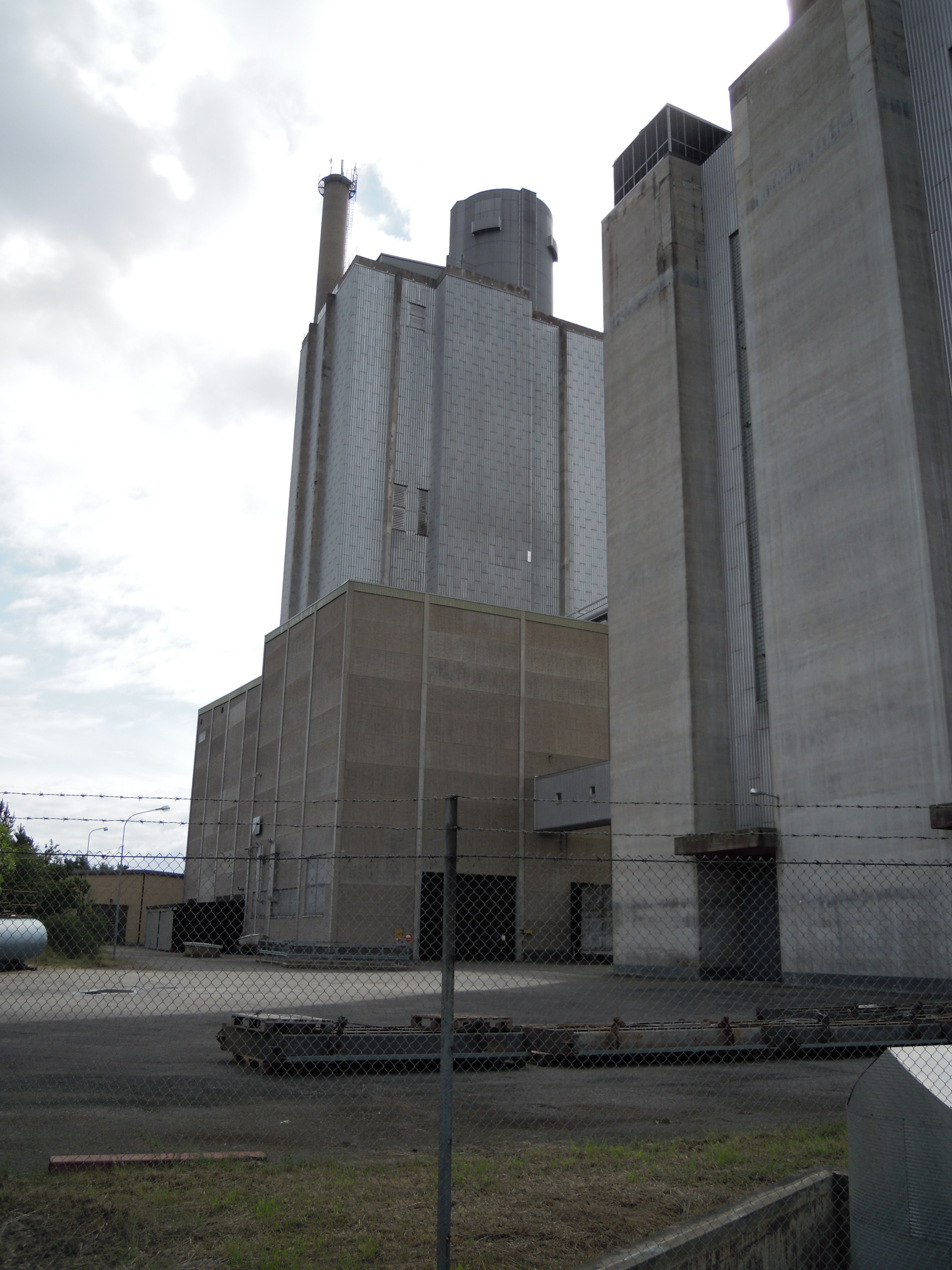
The reactor in 2010.

The situation that the reactor was nearly completed, but never loaded with fuel, made it possible to use the plant for advanced international experiments during late 1970s and early 1980s, simulating various aspects of accident scenarios in nuclear power plants. Four series of experiments were performed:

- MARVIKEN-FSCB-I/II, Marviken Full Scale Containment Blowdown experiments Series I/II - where the pressure-suppression principle with a condensation pool, used by nearly all BWR-reactors in the world, was tested. In a reactor with this design steam from postulated pipe breaks is directed down to a condensation pool, which causes the steam to condense which limits the pressure increase in the containment during such an accident scenario. This design make it possible to reduce the size of a BWR-containment.
- MARVIKEN-ATT, Marviken Aerosol Transport Test experiments - where migration and distribution of aerosols in a containment was studied, which is important for assessing accident scenarios with significant fuel melting, "core-melts".
- MARVIKEN-CFT, Marviken Full Scale Critical Flow Tests - where tests were performed for quantifying steam flows from pipe breaks
- MARVIKEN-JIT, Marviken Full Scale Jet Impingement Tests experiments - where tests were performed for assessing to what extent the steam jet from a pipe break can damage nearby equipment.

Large amounts of data were collected and are archived at OECD/NEA, and have been used for validation of computer simulation codes for nuclear power plants.

== Conversion to fossil-fuel plant ==
When the construction of the nuclear reactor was finally stopped 1970 a boiler house and an oil fired steam boiler was built. This made it possible to use the non-nuclear parts of the power station as well as the connecting power grid line. Since the turbine was optimized for the comparably low steam temperature and pressure from a nuclear reactor the efficiency of the oil fired plant became low (approximately 30 percent) compared to conventional fossil-fuel fired plants which may have efficiencies of 40 or even close to 50 percent. Hence the plant was only used as a peak load plant.

The oil fired boiler had a thermal power of approximately 700 MW at an oil consumption of 17 kg/s, and the corresponding electrical power was approximately 200 MW. The plant was in operation until March 2009, but has since been decommissioned.

== In popular culture ==
The nuclear reactor at Marviken plays a big role in Swedish thriller/sci-fi writer Lars Wilderäng's 2020 novel Redovisningsavdelning Marviken (lit. 'Accounting Department Marviken').
