= Studsvik =

Swedish company

Coordinates: 58°45.88′N 17°22.67′E

- Founded: 1947; 79 years ago
- Headquarters: Nyköping, Sweden
- Number of locations: 16 (2019)
- Number of employees: 600 (2019)
- Website: www.studsvik.com/en/

Studsvik is a supplier of nuclear analysis software and specialised services to the international nuclear industry. The company is headquartered in Nyköping, Sweden, and has five divisions: Sweden, United Kingdom, Germany, the United States, and Global Services. There are 1,100 employees in 8 countries. The company's shares are listed on the Nasdaq OMX Stockholm.

Studsvik offers advanced technical services to the international nuclear power industry in areas including fuel analysis software, waste treatment, decommissioning, engineering and services, and operating efficiency.

The company was founded in Stockholm in 1947, as AB Atomenergi, to develop and operate nuclear power stations in Sweden. Originally it was 57% government-owned; during the 1960s, the government acquired the entirety of the shares, but then in the 1970s, government funding was reduced and the company became entirely industry-owned and changed its name to Studsvik Energiteknik AB. Studsvik is the name of the property east of Nyköping, where the business had moved during the 1960s.

In 2005, Studsvik's two research reactors, R2 (50 MW) and R2-0 (1 MW), were decommissioned. There was also a third research reactor in Studsvik called FR-0, which was a zero-power fast reactor with low power output. It was operated 1964–1971 and is now dismantled.

In the 1990s and 2000s, the company acquired the German SINA Industrieservice GmbH; the nuclear power division of the Norwegian Scandpower AS; the German Industrieanlagen Fritz & Marx; the British Environmental Remediation Services Ltd.; the ISS international health physics group; the American RACE LLC; the German Dr Fary GmbH & Co KG and the English Alpha Engineering Ltd.

Studsvik has a radioactive waste processing facility in Erwin, Tennessee in the US, which opened in 2000. The facility operates in partnership with Waste Control Specialists in Andrews County, Texas. With Washington Group Inc., Studsvik co-owns THOR Treatment Technologies, LLC. Studsvik also operates a facility in Memphis, Tennessee on President's Island, which is in the Mississippi River. In January 2008, Studsvik obtained a licence for a radioactive metal recycling plant near Sellafield in England. Studsvik's metal-recycling facility, designed to assist the Nuclear Decommissioning Authority's National LLW Strategy, opened in September 2009. Decontaminating metallic waste both greatly reduces the quantity of waste requiring to be disposed of at the LLW Repository, and recovers valuable metal.

Studsvik is the global leader in fuel vendor-independent software for reactor analysis. Studsvik software has been used throughout the world for light water reactor core design, analysis, and operational support.

In April 2011, Studsvik praised defeat of a bill in the US State of Tennessee legislature that would have prohibited dumping low-level nuclear waste in landfills. Both of Studsvik's US processing facilities are in Tennessee. Tennessee is one of the few states that allows dumping of low-level nuclear waste in landfills and the only state that allows dumping of nuclear waste on a single-license, rather than seek government approval for each shipment of waste.
